= Brahim Boushaki =

Algerian Sufi theologian (1912-1997)

- Title: Mufti

Personal life
- Born: إبراهيم بن علي بن محمد بن علي بوسحاقي; 1912 CE/1330 AH Soumâa, Boumerdès, Algeria
- Died: 1997 CE/1418 AH Kouba, Algiers, Algeria
- Resting place: Sidi Garidi Cemetery
- Home town: Thénia
- Parents: Sidi Boushaki; Ali Boushaki; Mohamed Seghir Boushaki; Abderrahmane Boushaki; Yahia Boushaki; Mohamed Rahmoune
- Other names: El Hadj Ibrahim الحاج إبراهيم

Religious life
- Religion: Islam, Algerian Islamic reference
- Order: Rahmaniyya Sufi order
- School: Zawiyet Sidi Boushaki; Zawiyet Sidi Boumerdassi; Zawiyet Sidi Amar Cherif; Zawiyet El Hamel
- Profession: Hezzab, Imam, Khatib

Senior posting
- Period in office: 1938-1997

Brahim Boushaki (Arabic: إبراهيم بن علي بوسحاقي Ibrahim ibn Ali al-Boushaki) (1912 CE/1330 AH – 1997 CE/1418 AH) was an Algerian Scholar, Imam and Sufi Sheikh. He was born in the village of Soumâa near the town of Thénia 53 km east of Algiers. He was raised in a very spiritual environment within Zawiyet Sidi Boushaki with high Islamic values and ethics. He had great interpersonal skills and devoted his entire life in service of Islam and Algeria according to the Algerian Islamic reference.

== Family ==
Brahim Boushaki was born in 1912 in the historic village of Soumâa perched at the top of the Col des Beni Aïcha in Lower Kabylia.

He is part of the 16th generation of the descendants of the illustrious Algerian theologian Sidi Boushaki (1394–1453) who was one of the colleagues of Sidi Abderrahmane Thaalibi (1384–1479) in his initiatory journey in Bejaïa and elsewhere at the beginning of the Gregorian 15th century.

His father, Ali Boushaki (1855–1965) was the muqaddam of the Rahmaniyya Sufi order east of Algiers, and the Sufism of Zawiyet Sidi Boushaki south of Thénia.

His grandfather, Cheikh Mohamed Boushaki (1834–1887) was one of the leaders of the Mokrani Revolt in 1871 with the marabout Cheikh Boumerdassi of Zawiyet Sidi Boumerdassi and the Cheikh Cherifi of Zawiyet Sidi Amar Cherif, as well as the other zawiyas of Kabylia under the leadership of Cheikh Mokrani.

His great-grandfather Cheikh Ali Boushaki (1795–1846) was also one of the resistance fighters against the French conquest of Algeria during his campaign against Kabylia which began in 1837, and he was an ally of Cheikh Mohamed ben Zamoum as well as of Emir Abdelkader in the region of the Khachna massif.

== Early life ==
The first years of Brahim Boushaki's education took place during the beginning of the 20th century in his native village under the spiritual authority of his father Ali in the zawiya of his ancestors.

This period coincided with the outbreak of the First World War in which his older brother, Abderrahmane Boushaki, enlisted and from which he returned with the rank of corporal.

Brahim thus learned the Quran as well as the basic collections of the Muslim religion in the zawiya of his village of Soumâa (Thala Oufella) before moving to the Zawiyet Sidi Boumerdassi in the village of Ouled Boumerdès to perfect his knowledge and to deepen his initiatory journey.

He then began training to pursue a career as an imam in the Zawiyet Sidi Amar Cherif where he distinguished himself by his memorial prowess and his verbal eloquence which enabled him to obtain a Quranic and scientific Idjaza.

== Al Fath Mosque ==
When Brahim obtained all the didactic skills to fully assume his obligations as Imam, he joined his father Ali who had then been appointed mufti in the Al-Fath mosque which was erected in the center of the city of Thénia in 1926.

This period saw the advent of Algerian participation in the five-year elections which allowed villagers to send their votes to French colonial institutions after Charles Jonnart had opted for the gradual insertion of Algerians into elective and electoral representativeness.

Indeed, the Algerian soldiers who came back alive from the Great War asked to have access to public service employment positions and to be able to have Muslim places of worship (Ibadah) built in the French colonies erected after 1871, especially in Lower Kabylia.

== Safir Mosque ==
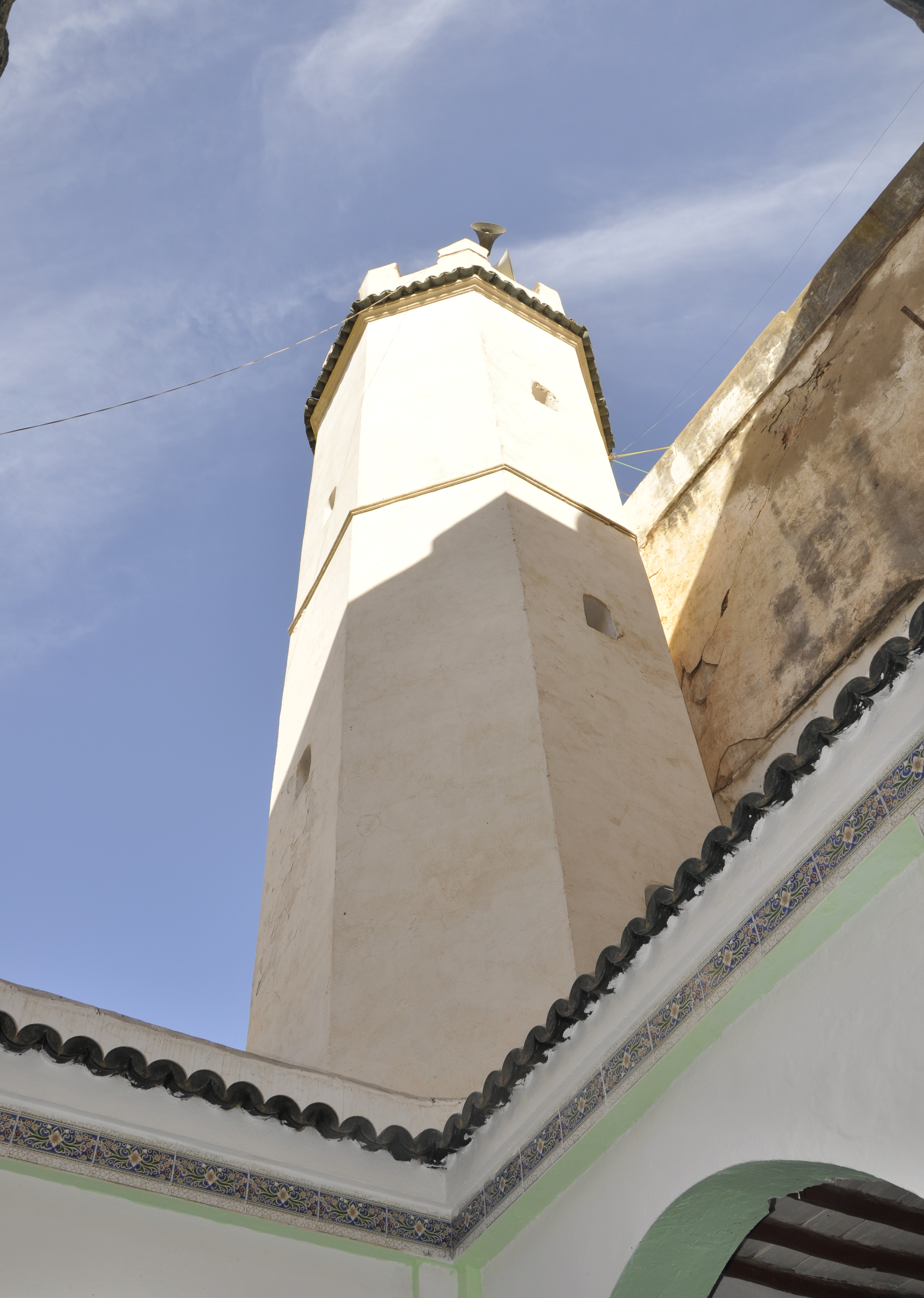
Safir Mosque

His paternal uncle Mohamed Seghir Boushaki (1869–1959), who had been elected in the meantime as a municipal councilor to represent the dozens of villages of the Col des Beni Aïcha in administrative institutions, worked for the introduction of his scholar nephew, Brahim in the large mosques of the city from Algiers.

This is how Imam Brahim Boushaki was recruited in 1947 as Hezzab in the Safir Mosque within the Casbah of Algiers under the authority of the then Maliki mufti Mohamed Baba Ameur.

The Safir Mosque was then a center of Algerian nationalism which brought together four powerful Imams who stirred the entire periphery of Algiers, Sheikh Brahim Boushaki represented Kabylia, Sheikh Mohamed Charef represented the valley of Khemis Miliana, Sheikh Mohamed Douakh represented the Titteri, while the Sheikh Ahmed Benchicou meanwhile was the representative of the Algérois and Mitidja.

When Brahim was Hezzab in this mosque, his nephews Yahia Boushaki, Boualem Boushaki and Bouzid Boushaki periodically visited him to inquire about his situation and his needs, and they were then integrated into the revolutionary independentist networks before the outbreak of the uprising of 1 November 1954.

The faithful and practitioners who frequented this mosque were initiated into religious precepts according to the Algerian Islamic reference, based on the books and books approved and certified.

The daily Quranic recitation of the Hizb Rateb, and also periodically of the Salka, was on the menu of the spiritual services of the Algiers mosque.

This is how the voice of Sheikh Brahim Boushaki gave an imprint and a cachet to these circles of Holy Book recitation according to the Warsh recitation.

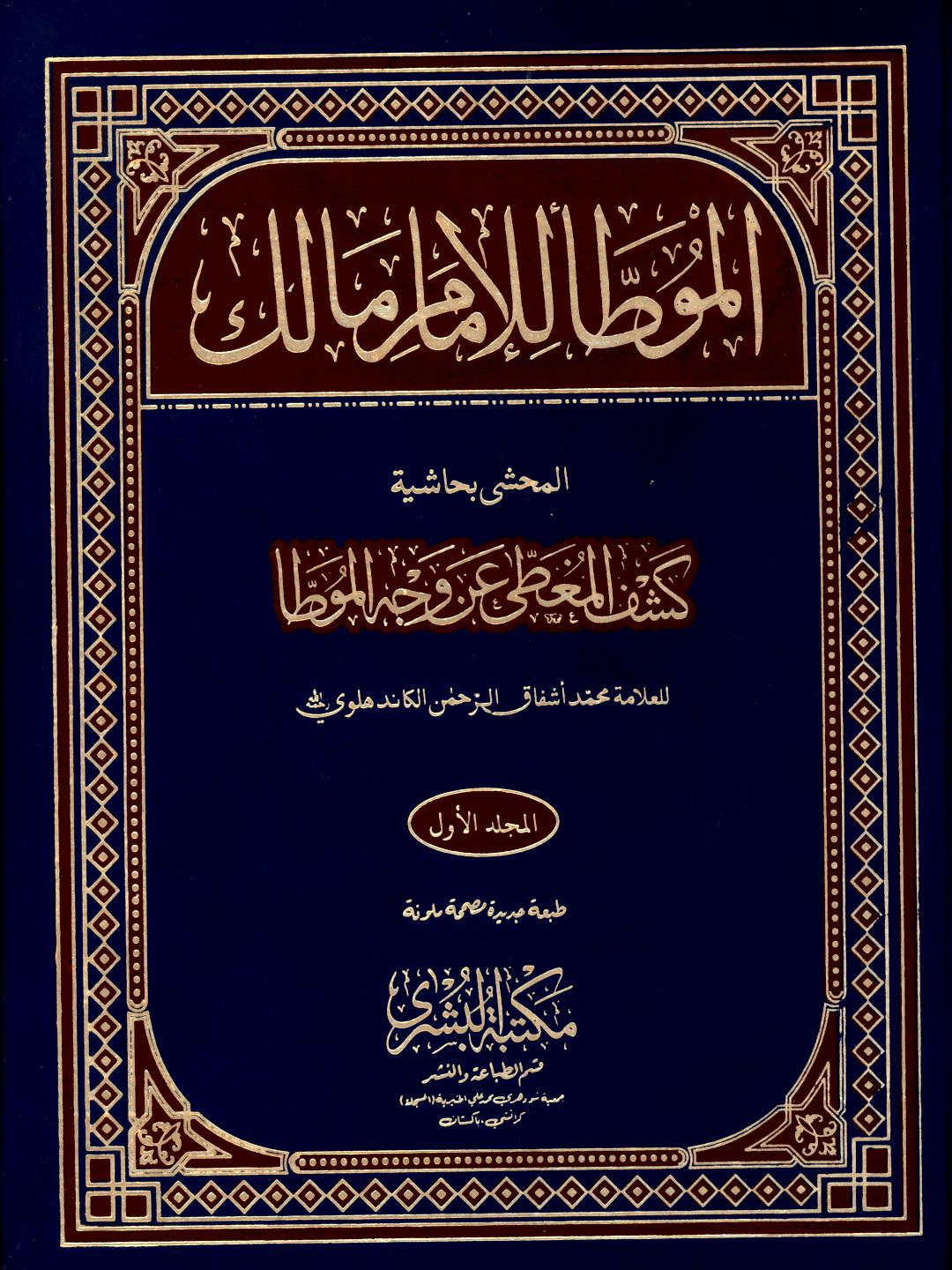
Muwatta Imam Malik

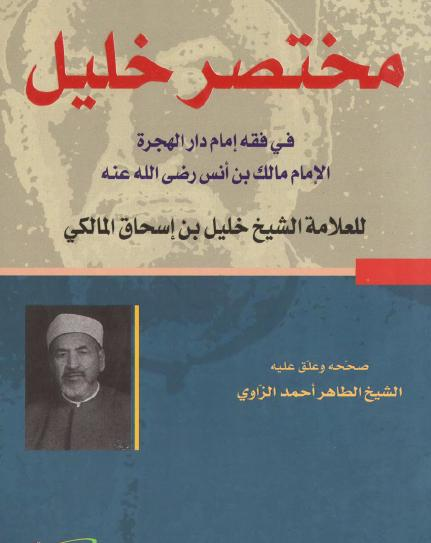
Mukhtasar Khalil

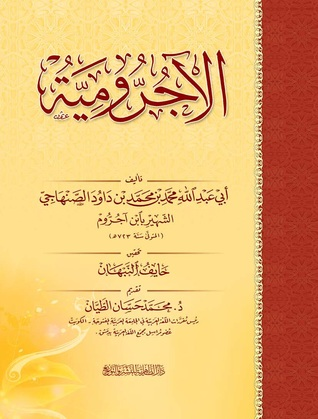
Al-Ajurrumiyya

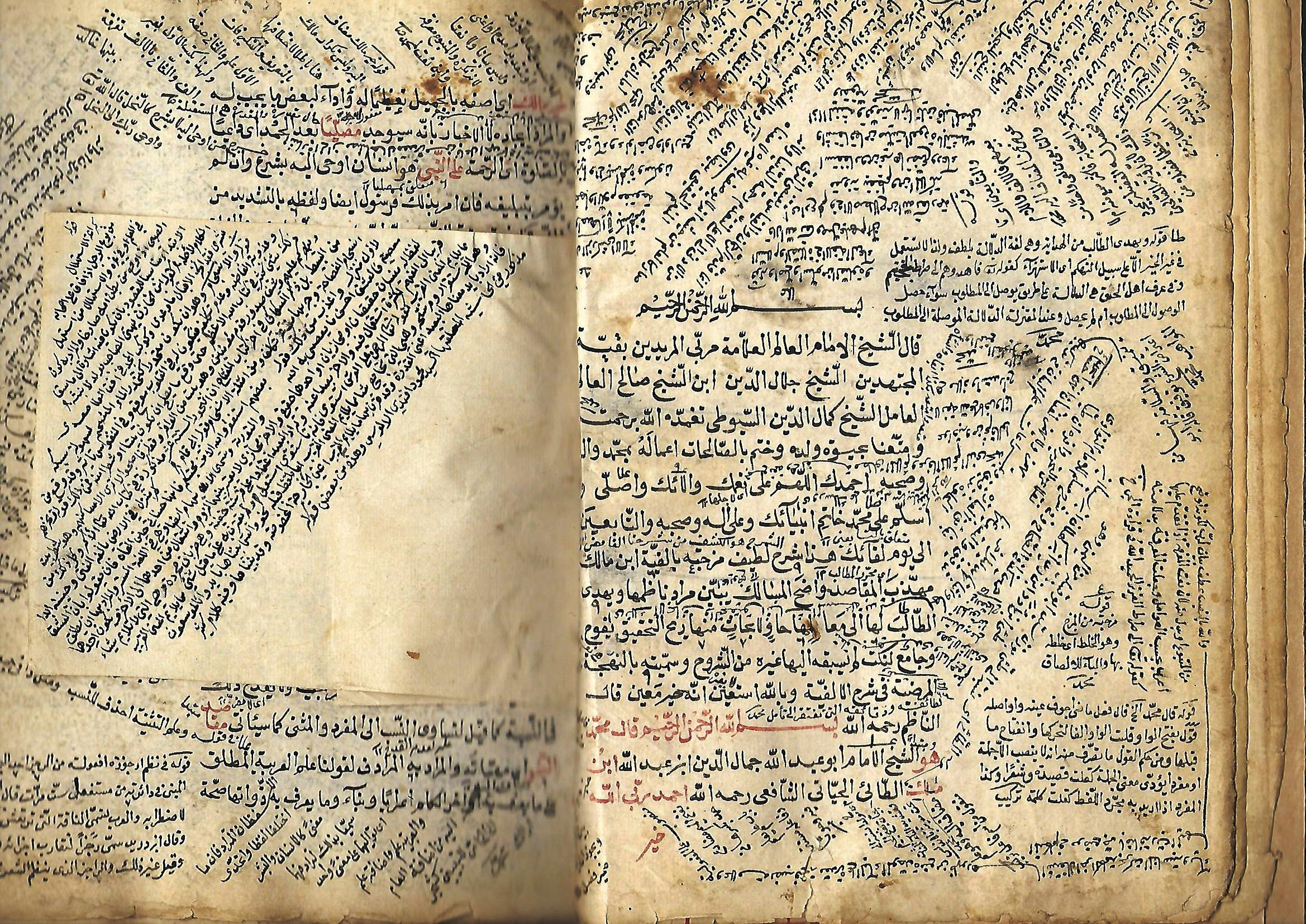
Al-Alfiyya of Ibn Malik

== Algerian Revolution ==
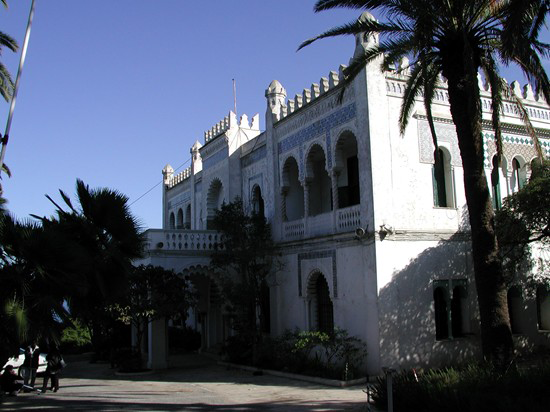
Villa Susini

The outbreak of the Algerian independence revolution took place after Lyès Deriche hosted the meeting of 22 veterans in his home in El Madania, and journalist Mohamed Aïchaoui wrote the proclamation of the start of the revolutionary struggle.

This is how the Casbah of Algiers was the place where Mohamed Boudiaf and Didouche Mourad met with journalist Mohamed Aïchaoui not far from the Safir Mosque to dictate the draft of the revolutionary proclamation.

During the two years preceding the great battle of Algiers in 1957, Imam Brahim Boushaki participated in the propaganda to support popular activism in Algiers in the company of two Imams who were close to him, Mohamed Salah Seddik and Mohamed Kettou.

But after the eight-day strike in 1957, the French response was very violent and the imams of Algiers mosques were imprisoned in the Villa Susini and in other torture centers.

Brahim Boushaki was then captured by French soldiers and taken to the Susini villa where he was savagely tortured before being imprisoned with his friend, Ahmed Chekkar in the same cell.

== Mosques of Algiers ==
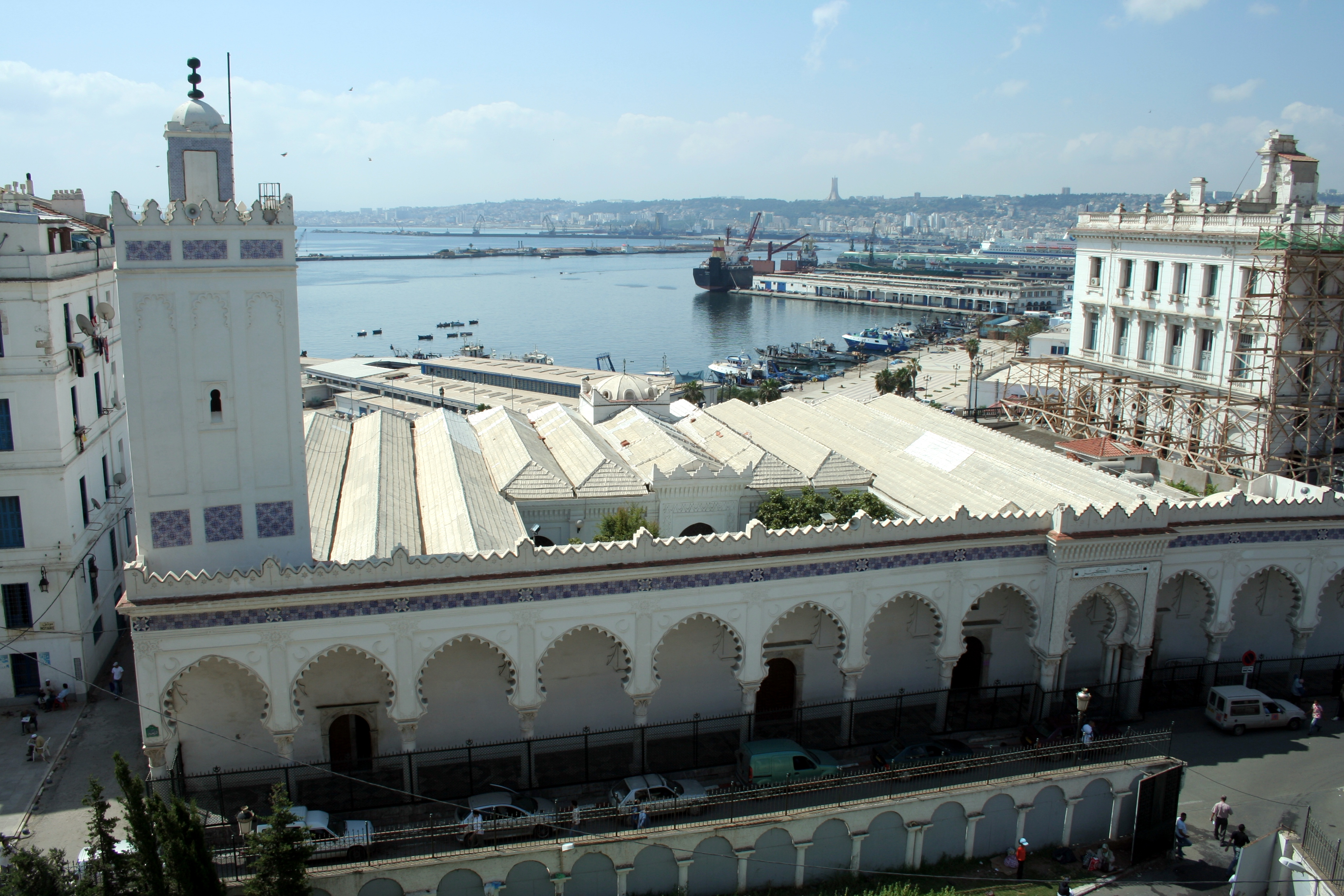
Djamaa el Kebir

After Algeria's independence in 1962, Imam Brahim Boushaki was rehabilitated in his religious functions in the Safir mosque along with the other Imams who had survived imprisonment and torture during the Algerian revolution which lasted almost eight years since 1954.

He then participated in the influence of the mosques of the Casbah of Algiers by promoting the assiduous recitation of the Hizb Rateb and the reading of Sahih Bukhari in the Djamaa el Djedid and Djamaa el Kebir with his friend, the illustrious Imam and mufti Abderrahmane Djilali.

In the meantime, Imam Brahim became a religious inspector affiliated with the Ministry of Religious Affairs in 1976 and his mission was to raise the professional and ethical level of Imams working in the Algérois region.

He also periodically supervised groups of Algerian pilgrims during the Hajj as a guide and mufti according to the madhhab Malikite.

== Return to Thénia ==
After the death of Ahmed Saad Chaouch in 1978, who had been Imam Khatib of the Al Fath Mosque in Thénia since 1962, Sheikh Brahim Boushaki replaced him in this religious post when he was 66 years old.

He then reorganized the Quranic and jurisprudential teaching in the Al Fath mosque according to a class regime for the evening teaching of schoolchildren in the city.

He was pursuing in his action the directives of the then minister Mouloud Kacem Naît Belkacem who favored the fact that mosques should also be places of teaching and intellectual emancipation in addition to the performance of the rites of Muslim worship.

As soon as he returned to Thénia, he set up a committee to rebuild and extend the Al Fath mosque in order to allow women to attend Friday prayers, Tarawih and Eid prayers.

Before the end of 1982, the area of the mosque was tripled and a first floor was built, as well as an ablution room in the basement, and the place of prayer was handed over to Muslim believers and practitioners.

Imam Brahim welcomed in this mosque visiting Imams who preached the good word in its mihrab and its minbar, while locally he encouraged the young murids to righteousness and morality.

His function as inspector of religious affairs helped him in his mission to build mosques throughout the new Boumerdès Province created in 1984, and this is how he was at the origin of the construction of the first mosque of the administrative city of Boumerdès, which was then baptized Jabir ibn Hayyan Mosque.

== Salafist terrorism ==
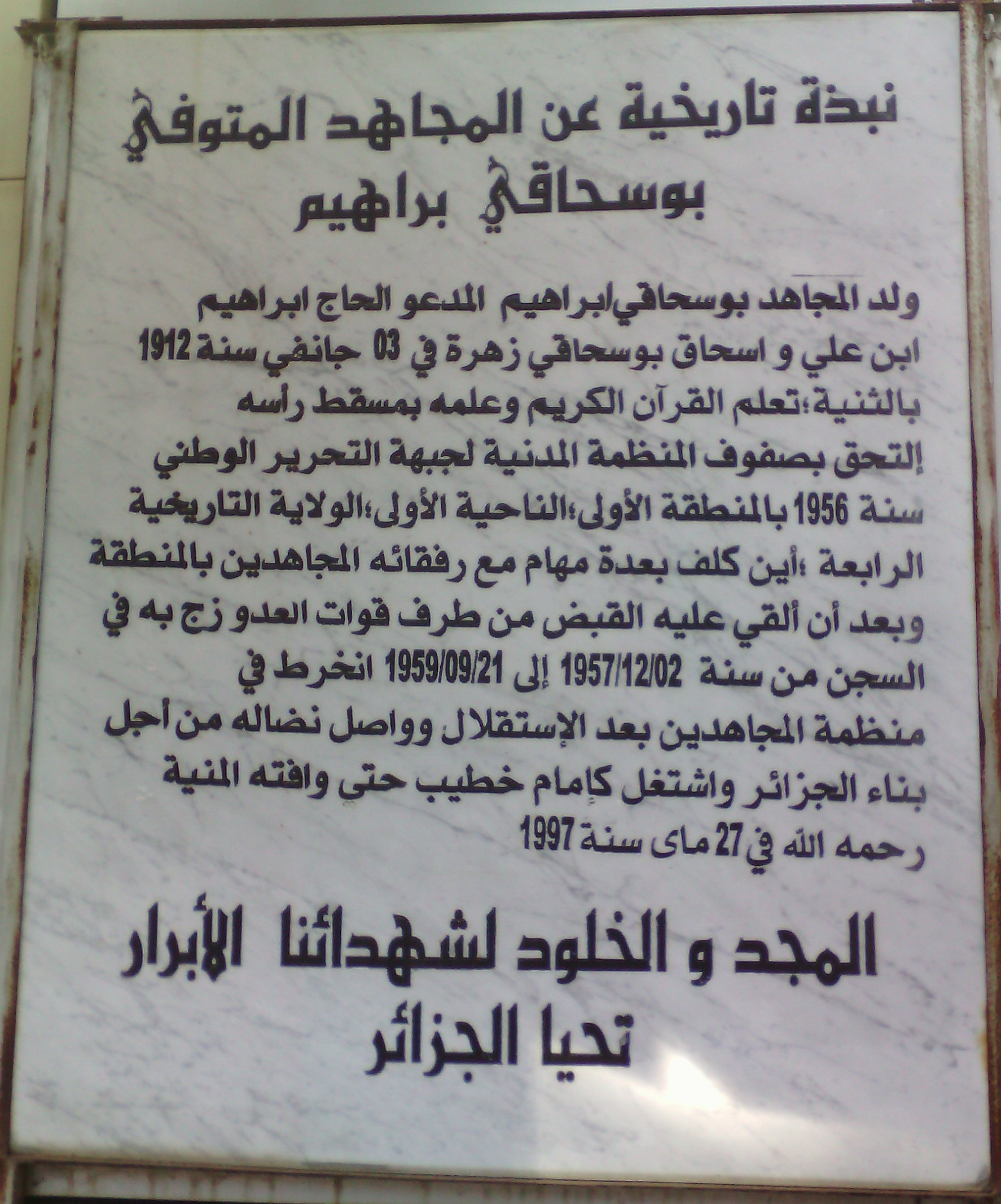
Biography of Brahim Boushaki (1912–1997)

From the onset of Salafist extremism in Algeria, the Sufi Imams were first targeted by the harassment of flocks and followers of fundamentalist Wahhabism in mosques in order to recover these places of worship and convert them into bases for the overthrow of Algerian social values.

Due to this account, the harassment of Imam Brahim began at the Al Fath mosque in Thénia during prayers, Friday sermons, and religious lessons, in an effort to stop his activities at the mosque.

With the accentuation of the terrorist threats of death which fell on him in Thénia, he, who had assumed all the prayers of Salat Fadjr until Salat Isha, Imam Brahim had to leave the city of Thenia and go into exile in the heights of Kouba in the city of Algiers in April 1993.

He was replaced in the mosque of Thénia by Imam Omar Arar, a native of the village Soumâa, in a climate of terror and recurring assassinations, and he was fatally murdered in front of his home on 13 October 1993 after Salat Icha.

The Salafist terrorists then took advantage of the curfew established during the night to break up Imam Brahim's home and to steal his imposing library containing book jewels.

Sheikh Brahim did not return to Thénia for four times while assassinations and terrorist massacres fell throughout the Boumerdès Province and left families and tribes in mourning.

Despite his advanced age and relocation to Algiers, Boushaki continued his religious activities alongside other religious figures in the capital during the Algerian Civil War.

== Death ==
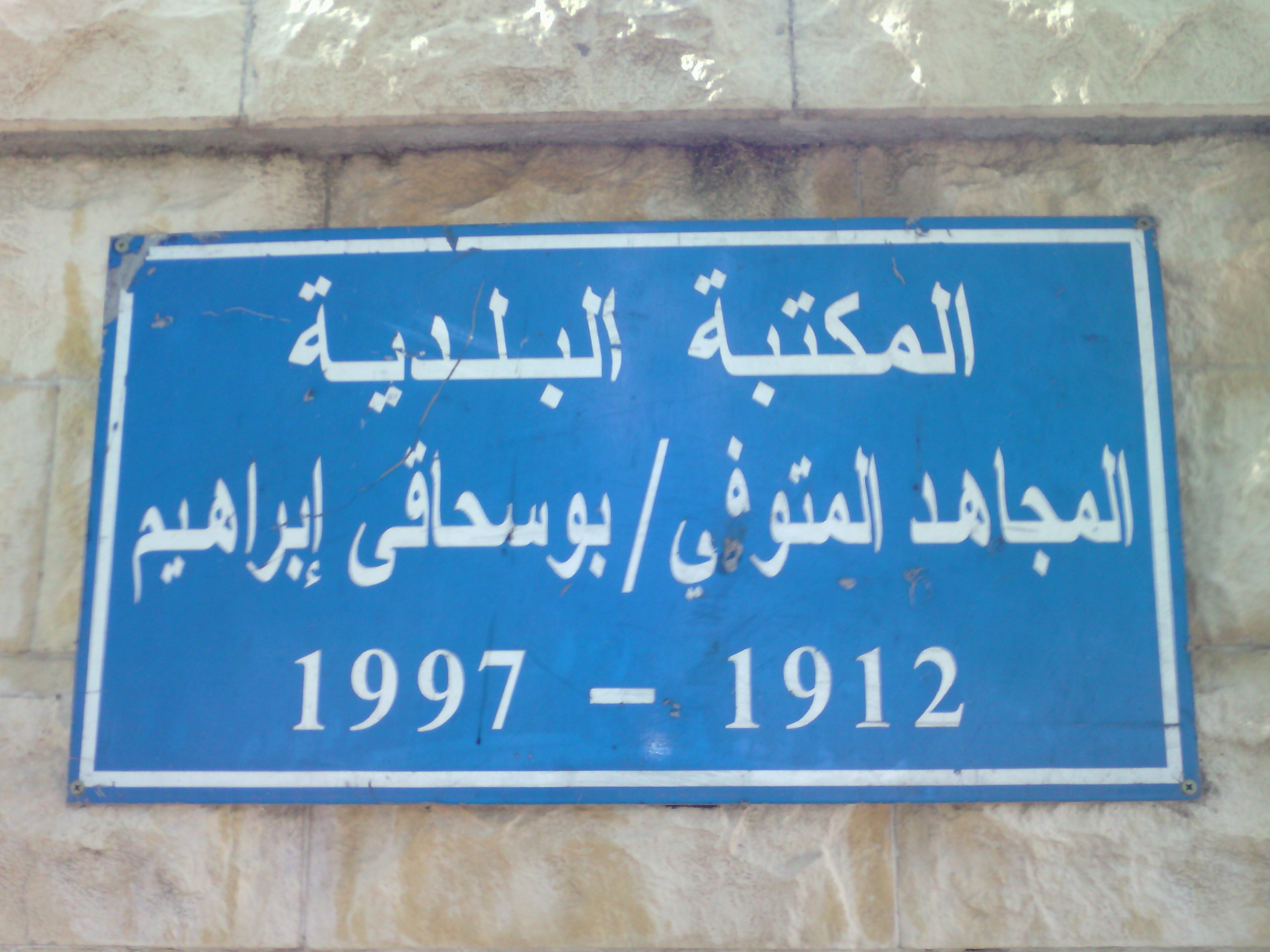
Brahim Boushaki Library

Imam Brahim Boushaki died during the year 1997 in the family home of his relatives in the commune of Kouba in the Algérois at the age of 85.

He died of a sudden heart attack while doing his ablution (Wudu) to perform his prayer (Salah) as usual, as a Muslim and as an Imam.

He was then buried in the Sidi Garidi Cemetery within the commune of Kouba in the presence of his relatives, friends and faithful, he who spent a large part of his life in the mosques of the capital Algiers.

== Gallery ==
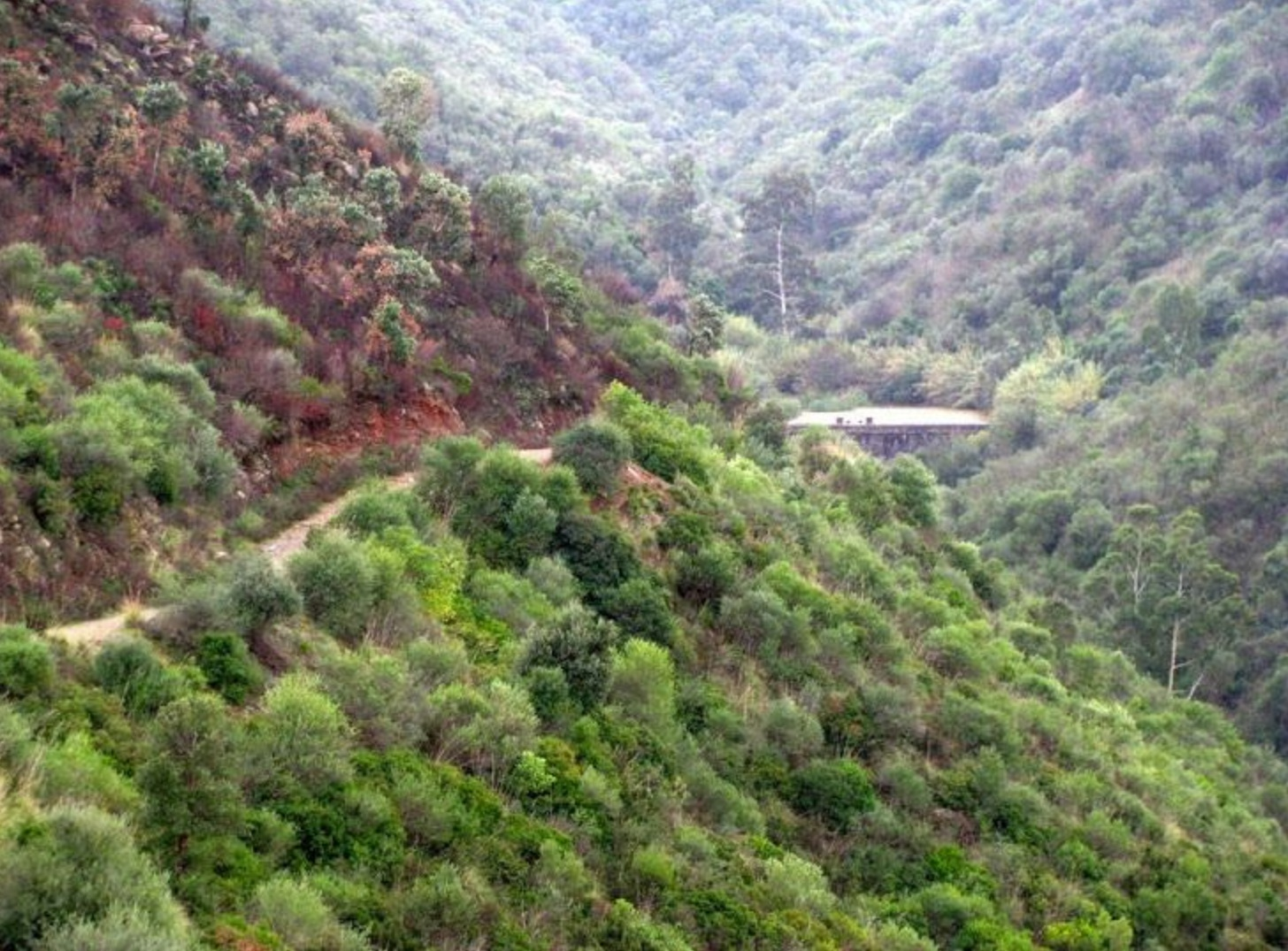
Meraldene Valley

== See also ==
- Algerian Islamic reference
- Sufism in Algeria
- Rahmaniyya
- Zawiyas in Algeria
- Zawiyet Sidi Boushaki
- Zawiyet Sidi Boumerdassi
- Zawiyet Sidi Amar Cherif
- Mosques in Algeria
- Safir Mosque

== Bibliography ==
- France: Assemblée nationale (1871-1942). Sénat (1922). Annales du Sénat: Débats parlementaires, Volume 94, Partie 2. Paris: Imprimerie des Journaux officiels. p. 1334.

== Videos ==
- 1- Biography of Sidi Boushaki (1394-1453) on YouTube
- 2- Biography of Sidi Boushaki on YouTube
- 3- Biography of Sidi Boushaki on YouTube
- 4- Biography of Sidi Boushaki on YouTube
- 5- Biography of Sidi Boushaki on YouTube
