= Poem of Sidi Boushaki =

Book of Arabic grammar

- Author: Sidi Boushaki
- Original title: نظم الزواوي
- Language: Arabic
- Subject: Arabic grammar, Expressing the Arabic grammar rules
- Genre: Poem
- Publication place: Algeria
- Pages: 150 verses
- OCLC: 4769980833
- Text: Poem of Sidi Boushaki at Wikisource

The Poem of Sidi Boushaki (Arabic: أرجوزة سيدي بوسحاقي) is a poem of Arabic grammar written by the theologian and linguist Sidi Boushaki (1394-1453).

== About Sidi Boushaki ==
He is Abu Ishaq Ibrahim bin Fayed al-Zawawi, an exegete of Quran, jurist and linguist, born in the Soumâa village near the town of Thénia from the works of Djurdjura in 796 AH and died in the year 857 AH, and was buried next to Meraldene River in the Zawiyet Sidi Boushaki within the Khachna Mountains.

He has several books, the most famous of which are:

- An exegesis of the Quran called "Tafsir al-Zawawi" (Arabic: تفسير الزواوي).
- Three commentaries of the Mukhtasar Khalil on Maliki fiqh (Arabic: مختصر خليل).
- "Talkhis al-Talkhis", is an explanation of the book Talkhis al-Miftah on rhetoric, meanings and statement (Arabic: تلخيص التلخيص).

== Description ==
The Poem of Sidi Boushaki is considered as one of the most famous books of the Arabic tongue in the Islamic world that dealt with grammar by explaining the prose text expressing the Arabic grammar rules written by Ibn Hisham al-Ansari.

It is considered one of the most famous entries on Arabic grammar among the books of Sidi Boushaki, and there are several manuscripts and published books interpreting and explaining this poem under the title "Argouzat al-Zawawi in grammar" (Arabic: أرجوزة الزواوي في النحو).

== Contents ==
The grammarian Sidi Boushaki composed his poem in 150 verses in accordance the arabic poetry metre called rajaz.

He demonstrated in this text about his mastery in the arabic prosody and poetry, which gave the poem acceptance, admiration and spread in the world.

== Summary ==
The author divided his long poem into three main sections, namely the introduction, then the body, and finally the conclusion.

In the first six verses, the author provided a summary of the content of the poem, which aims to teach Arabic grammar and ʾIʿrab according to rajaz type, which is an easy-to-memorize expression on the part of students of the Arabic language.

Then came the text of the poem in 138 verses divided into four chapters, the first chapter is about the sentence (Arabic: الجملة), the second chapter is about the preposition and postposition (Arabic: الجار والمجرور), the third chapter is about the exceptional words in parsing, and the fourth chapter is about the special phrases in parsing.

The writer concluded his poem in the chapter on the conclusion, where he singled out six verses to summarize his composition, praise God (Allah) and send blessings upon Muhammad.

== Annotations ==
Several linguists have written books on explaining the poem of Sidi Boushaki, due to its simplicity and ease of preservation in schools. Among these narrations and exegeses, we can cite:

- Grammatical quotation in explaining the poetry of Al-Zawawi (arabic: القبس النحوي في شرح نظم الزواوي).
- The sweet resource containing the explanation of the poem of Imam Al-Zawawi (arabic: المنهل العذب الحاوي شرح أرجوزة الإمام الزواوي).
- The new saying in the useful explanation of Al-Zawawi (arabic: القول الجديد في شرح الزواوي المفيد).
- The host guide and assistant to the one who intends to understand the poem of Al-Zawawi (arabic: المرشد الآوي ومعين الناوي لفهم قصيدة الزواوي).
- The students’ goal in explaining Al-Zawawi’s poetry of the rules of syntax (arabic: ضالة الطلاب في شرح نظم الزواوي لقواعد الإعراب).
- The new in explaining the poetry of Al-Zawawi to express the Arabic language (arabic: الجديد في شرح نظم الزواوي لإعراب اللفظ العربي).
- Poem of Al-Zawawi (arabic: نظم الزواوي).
