= Mohamed Rahmoune =

Algerian revolutionary (1940–2022)

- Born: Mohamed Rahmoune; 1940; Thenia, then part of French Algeria (now Algeria)
- Died: 4 February 2022 (aged 81–82); Thenia, Algeria
- Resting place: Thénia Cemetery, Algeria
- Other names: Si Rabah, Rabah Rahmoune
- Known for: National Liberation Front; National Liberation Army; Toussaint Rouge; Algerian War
- Movement: FLN, ALN

Mohamed Rahmoune (1940 – 4 February 2022), also known as Si Rabah or Rahmoune, was a revolutionary leader during the Algerian War of Independence and a member of the Front de Libération Nationale (FLN; National Liberation Front).

== Early life and education ==
Rahmoune was born in 1940 in the village of Soumâa, located in the far north, 53 km east of Algiers (near the Blida coast), into a Kabyle maraboutic family descended from the Maliki and Sufi theologian Sidi Boushaki (1394–1453).

His early years coincided with the Second World War, during which civil life in French Algeria was disrupted by the imposition of a state of exception. The situation brought an end to the participation of his uncle (Mohamed Seghir Boushaki) in the colonial administrative structure, where he had served as an adviser and representative of Algerian natives.

In 1945, Rahmoune began studying the Quran and Arabic language with his brother, Djilali, at the Zawiyet Sidi Boushaki, under the guidance of Rahmaniyya mufti and muqaddam Ali Boushaki (1855–1965) as well as other teachers, including theologian Brahim Boushaki (1912–1997).

The 1945 Sétif and Guelma massacres influenced local perceptions of political participation under colonial rule. Rahmoune's early education and family environment exposed him to nationalist ideas and the broader movement for Algerian Independence. His cousin Yahia Boushaki (1935–1960) played a role in nationalist activities and supported his early involvement in resistance efforts.

== War of Independence ==
Rahmoune was 14 years old when the Algerian revolution started. Though young, he was considered well prepared both physically and politically to join the maquis and comfort the Algerian warriors against the French Army units to dislodge the French colonial system from Algeria

After the organization of the Soummam conference on 20 August 1956 and the revolutionary structuring of the Algerian territory, the armed action was entrusted to Mohamed's compatriots over 16 years of age to ignite the insurrection and perpetuate it by attacking the colony's interests in cities such as Thénia (formerly Ménerville), which was only 3 km north of his birth village.

Rahmoune participated, together with his cousin Bouzid Boushaki, in planting a bomb in the post office in the center of Thénia in 1956, as well as various sabotage actions in the colonial agricultural estates around this strategic railway city.

After his brother Djilali Rahmoune was martyred in action in 1957, Rahmoune joined the ranks of the National Liberation Army (ALN) in the third district, the first region, in the fourth historical wilaya, where he participated in many battles.

== Arrest and imprisonment ==
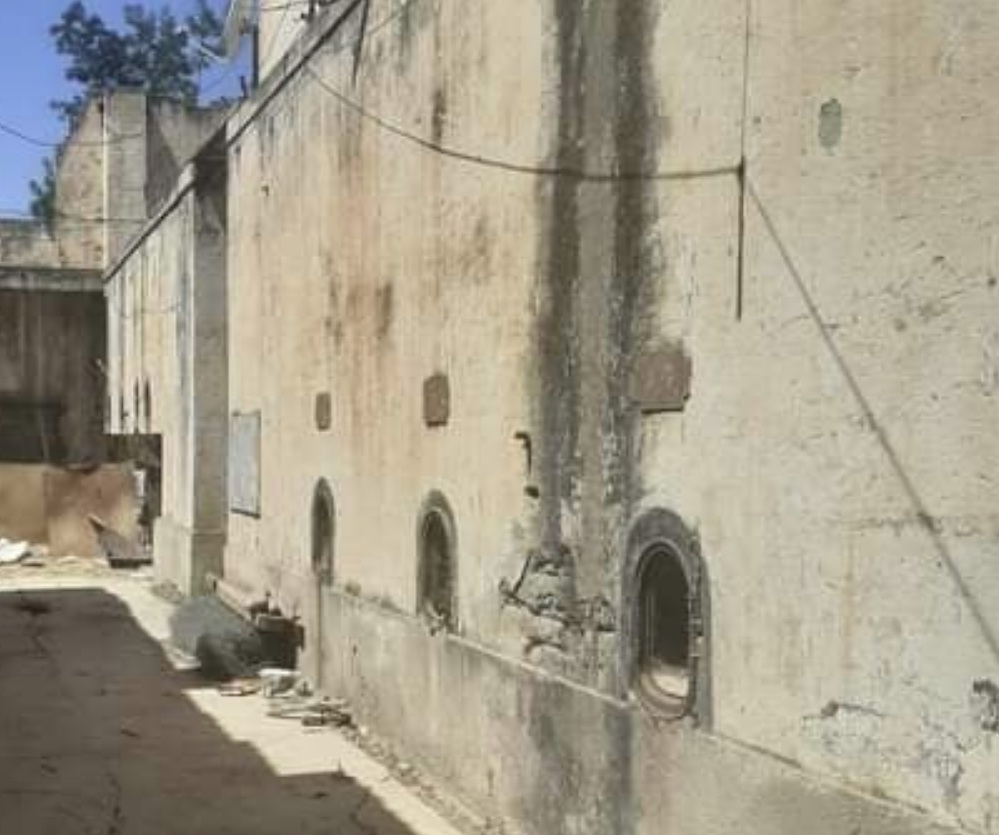
Ferme Gauthier

After participating in a 1957 military ambush against French soldiers near the town of Beni Amrane, Rahmoune was captured along with other surviving soldiers to be taken to the Ferme Gauthier torture camp in the north of the town of Souk El-Had, where he was tortured.

Many detainees succumbed to the pain and abuse they suffered. Their bodies and remains were subsequently hidden in wells or thrown into the waters of the Isser River.

After a few weeks at the camp, Rahmoune was transferred to the Serkadji Prison in the Casbah of Algiers to stand trial alongside the local leaders of the revolution.

== Escape ==
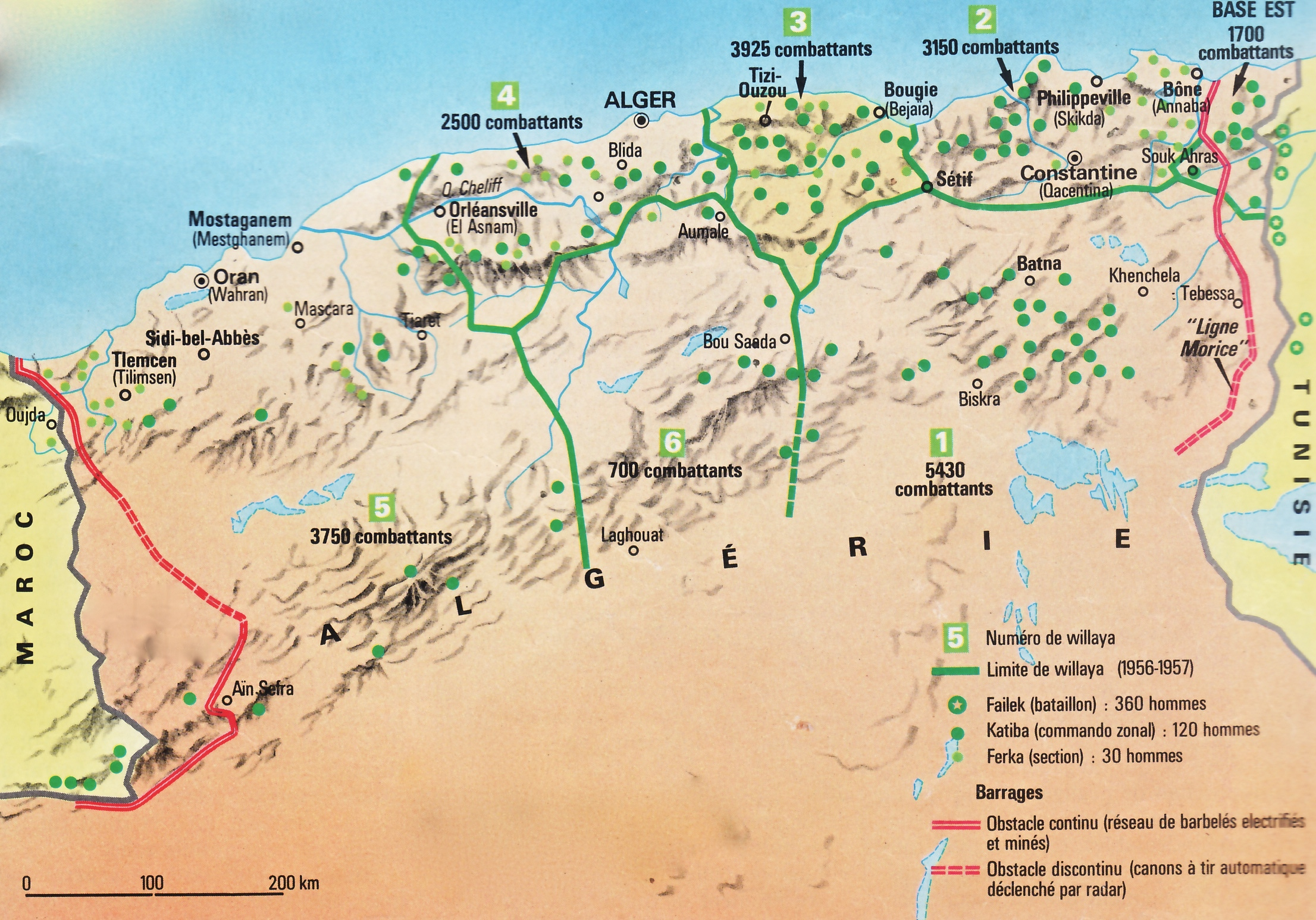
Six historical ALN wilayates during the Algerian Revolution.

Recovering from the aftermath of the 1957 battle and the various phases of torture he suffered, Rahmoune escaped from Boghar prison in 1959 with four mujahideen acolytes.

After crossing the Chahbounia ravines with his friends, he was picked up by the soldiers of the National Liberation Army (ALN), who took him to the headquarters of the fourth historical wilayah to meet Colonel M'Hamed Bougarra, who appointed Rahmoune as military secretary in the first region of this historic wilayah.

He then asked the command to post him to the Sour El-Ghozlane (former Aumale) region due to his high familiarity with the region and his strong revolutionary ties. There, he resumed military operations against French settlers and soldiers.

While traveling in 1960 to Mount Dirrah overlooking Sour El-Ghozlane to carry out one of the military operations he was orchestrating, he was exposed to a direct confrontation with enemy French forces, during which he suffered a significant knee injury. The injury made it difficult for him to move in the maquis, leading to another arrest by French soldiers and his transfer to the second office in Sour El-Ghozlane. Rahmoune was sent to the CMS prison, where he was tortured for 7 months by French soldiers. He remained in custody at the CMS until 23 February 1962, a few weeks before the ceasefire on 19 March, on the eve of independence after the Évian Accords had been concluded.

== Death ==
Mohamed Rahmoune died on 4 February 2022, in his family's home in Thénia at the age of 82.

He was buried the following day at the Djebanat El Ghorba Cemetery in southern Thénia on the outskirts of the village of Soumâa in front of his family and friends and a delegation from the Algerian government.

== See also ==
- Algerian nationalism
- Algerian War
