= Zawiyet Sidi Boushaki =

Lodge of Algerian Sufi Order

- زاوية سيدي بوسحاقي
- Other name: زاوية سيدي إبراهيم البوسحاقي
- Former name: زاوية ثنية بني عائشة
- Type: Zawiya
- Established: 1442 CE / 846 AH
- Founder: Sidi Boushaki (1394–1453)
- Affiliations: Algerian Islamic reference; Ministry of Religious Affairs and Endowments
- Religious affiliation: Sufism in Algeria - Qadiriyya - Rahmaniyya
- Location: Soumâa, Thénia, Kabylia, Boumerdès Province, 35005, Algeria; 36.7049702°N 3.5540682°E
- Language: Arabic, Berber

Zawiyet Sidi Brahim Boushaki (Arabic: زاوية سيدي إبراهيم البوسحاقي) or Zawiyet Thénia is a zawiya of the Rahmaniyya Sufi brotherhood located at Boumerdès Province, in the lower Kabylia region of Algeria.

== Construction ==
The zawiya of Soumâa was built in 1442 at Col des Beni Aïcha in the south-eastern heights of the current town of Boumerdès in Kabylia.

The founder of this Sufi school was the great scholar Sidi Brahim bin Faïd al-Boushaki (1394–1453), who established this zawiya for the purpose of education, so as to serve as a beacon for the people of the Khachna mountains, thus its scientific light rays extending to every corner of those lands.

== Missions ==
The zawiya of Sidi Brahim Boushaki at Thala Oufella (Soumâa) village was considered a prominent place of religious teaching, for the memorization of the Quran and for the teaching of its basic rulings to young people there, thus providing the various mosques of lower Kabylia region, each year during the holy month of Ramadan, with a preservation of the Muslim holy book that was useful for performing the Tarawih prayers, which are characteristic of that very month, and during which the Quran is recited with the Warsh.

This zawiya, which opened its doors for the first time in 1442, enjoyed an important ranking in the field of religious formation, as it annually graduated several Huffaz of the Quran, who were also well-learned of both the latter's rulings and the science of Hadith, and who were crucial in framing the various mosques scattered across the region of the Meraldene river.

It was a place to study and teach the Quran, as well as to provide aid for the needy and for those who were about to get married, and also to organize circumcision ceremonies.

It was one of the Algerian Zawiyas that played a prominent role in the social life of the Thénia region, and was also considered a Sufi zawiya, as it was based on the traditional way of teaching the Quran and the Sunnah.

The learner (talibe) intended to write the Quranic verses by himself using the traditional ink, which was a special ink that the learner made out of sheep's wool, where he melted it on fire until it became black, and then mixed it with water; the characteristic specific to this ink being that it did not disappear from the written tablet except by rubbing it with clay and water.

== Location ==
This zawiya was located on a mountain top of the Tell Atlas, where the village of Soumâa is also found, at an altitude of 410 meters, in Col des Beni Aïcha.

It is thus perched in the northeast of the Khachna Massif which overhangs Oued Meraldene and Oued Isser in the lower Kabylia, and is located to the east of the plain of Issers.

== Sufism ==
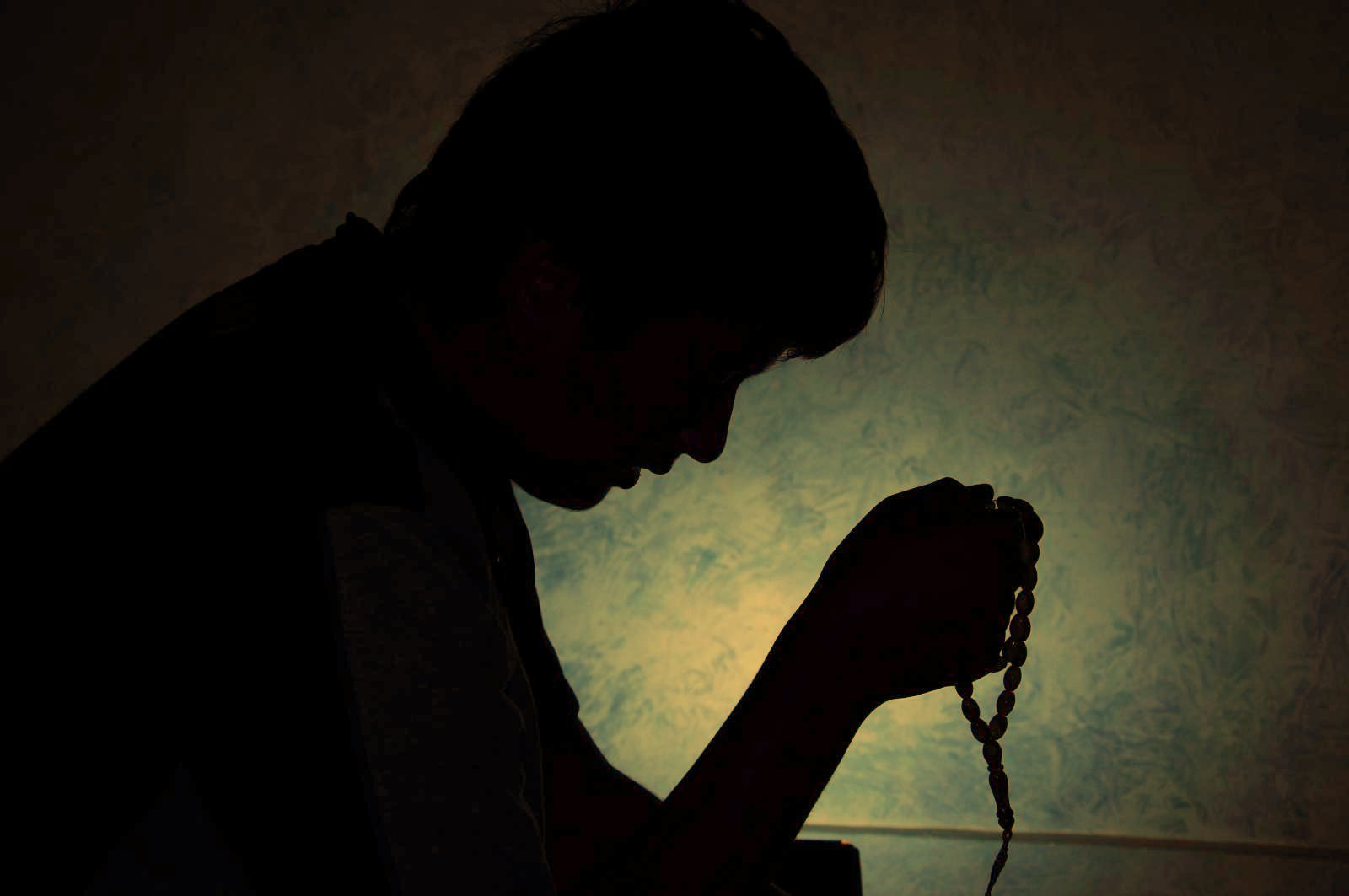
Misbaha for Tasbih.

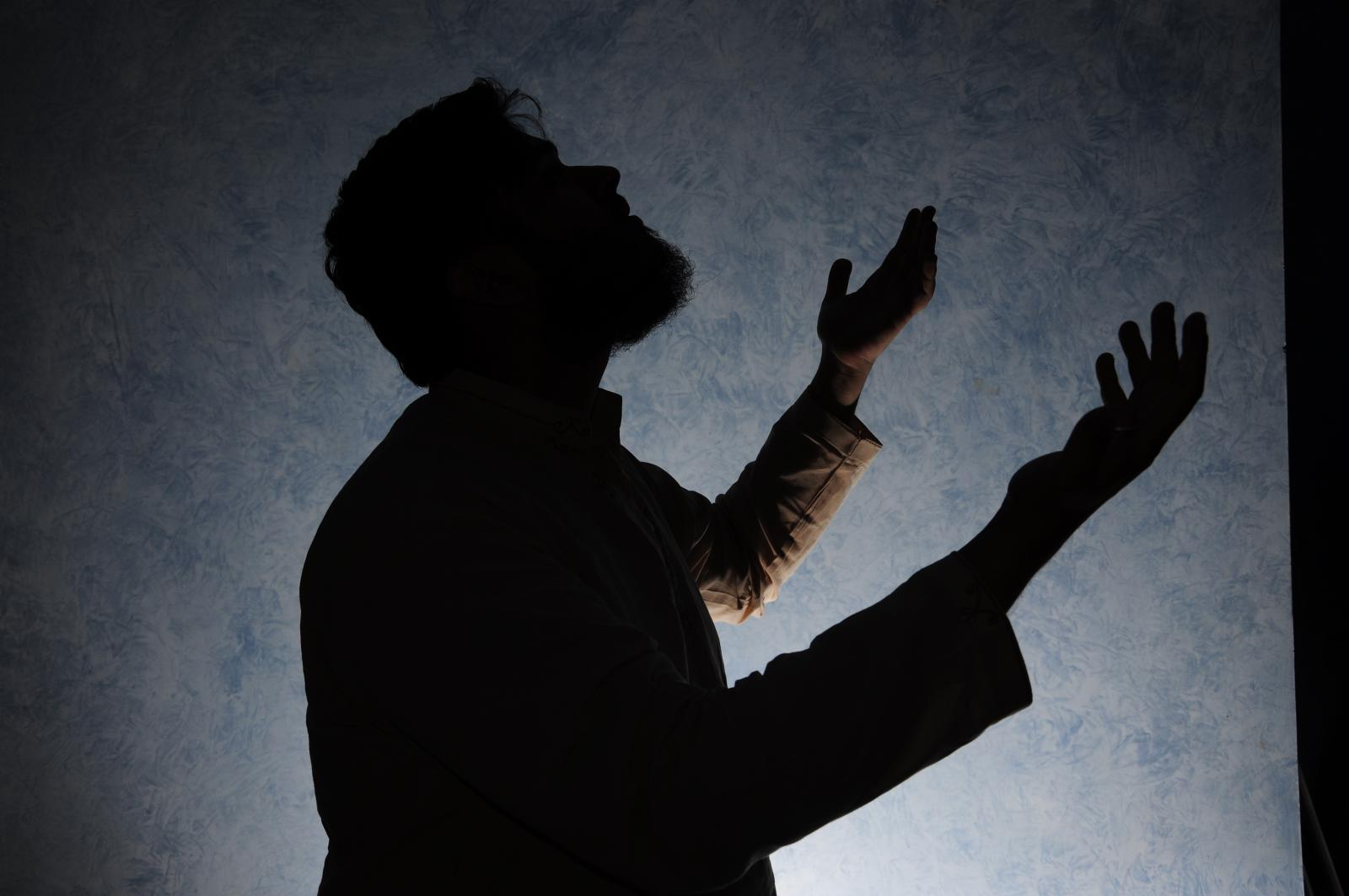
Raising hands in Dua

The Talibe who intended to be initiated in the ascetic and transcendent way of this Sufi zawiya had to follow a spiritual path based on the Dhikr, the Wird, and the Wazifa in order to follow the path of the Murids and the Saliks.

The Marabouts and Muqaddams who oversaw this Zawiya worked to initiate each Hafiz and Qari frequenting this institution in order for the latter two to become Wasils and Rabbanis.

== Teachings ==
Several Islamic sciences were taught in this zawiya of the Rahmaniyya brotherhood, for instance the science of Hadith as it is taught according to the Al-Muwatta, compiled by Imam Malik ibn Anas. The Fiqh was taught according to the Maliki Madhhab, and it was observed in the courts of this zawiya according to the Mukhtasar Khalil, written by Khalil ibn Ishaq al-Jundi.

Another book of the Maliki Fiqh taught in this zawiya was the Risala Al-Fiqhiya, written by Ibn Abi Zayd al-Qayrawani, and a third Maliki Fiqh book taught there was the Matn Ibn Ashir, written by Abdul Wahid Ibn Ashir.

The Arabic language was taught in the zawiya on the basis of the text of the Al-Alfiyya of Ibn Malik, composed by Ibn Malik, and the syntax of the Arabic language was taught there on the basis of the text of the Al-Ajurrumiyya, composed by Ibn Adjurrum.

The teaching of this very syntax was based on the text of Qatr al-Nada, composed by Ibn Hisham al-Ansari.

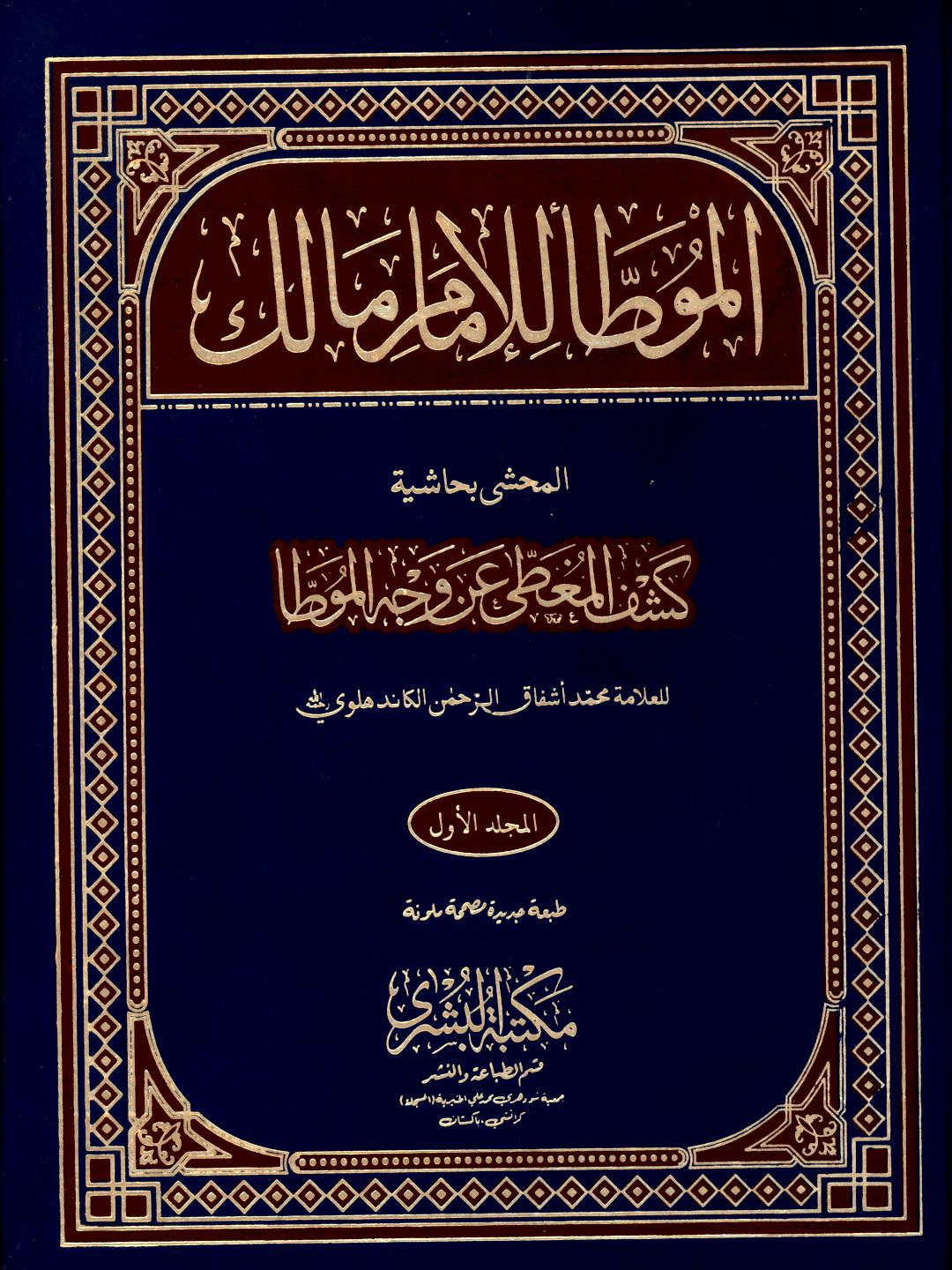
Muwatta Imam Malik

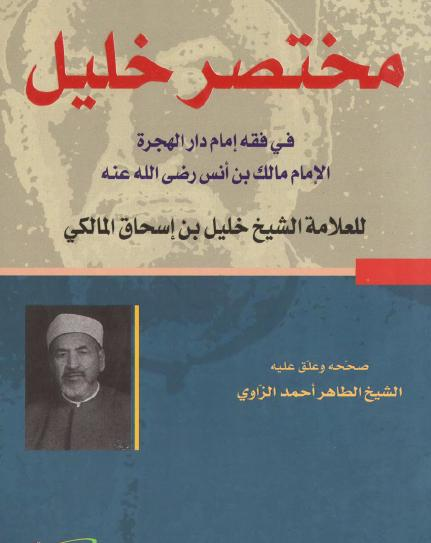
Mukhtasar Khalil

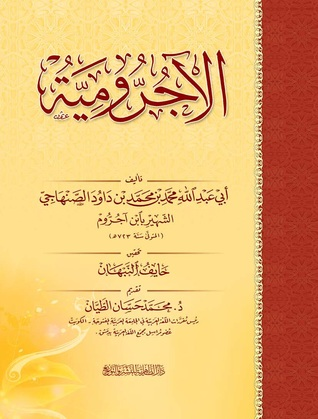
Al-Ajurrumiyya

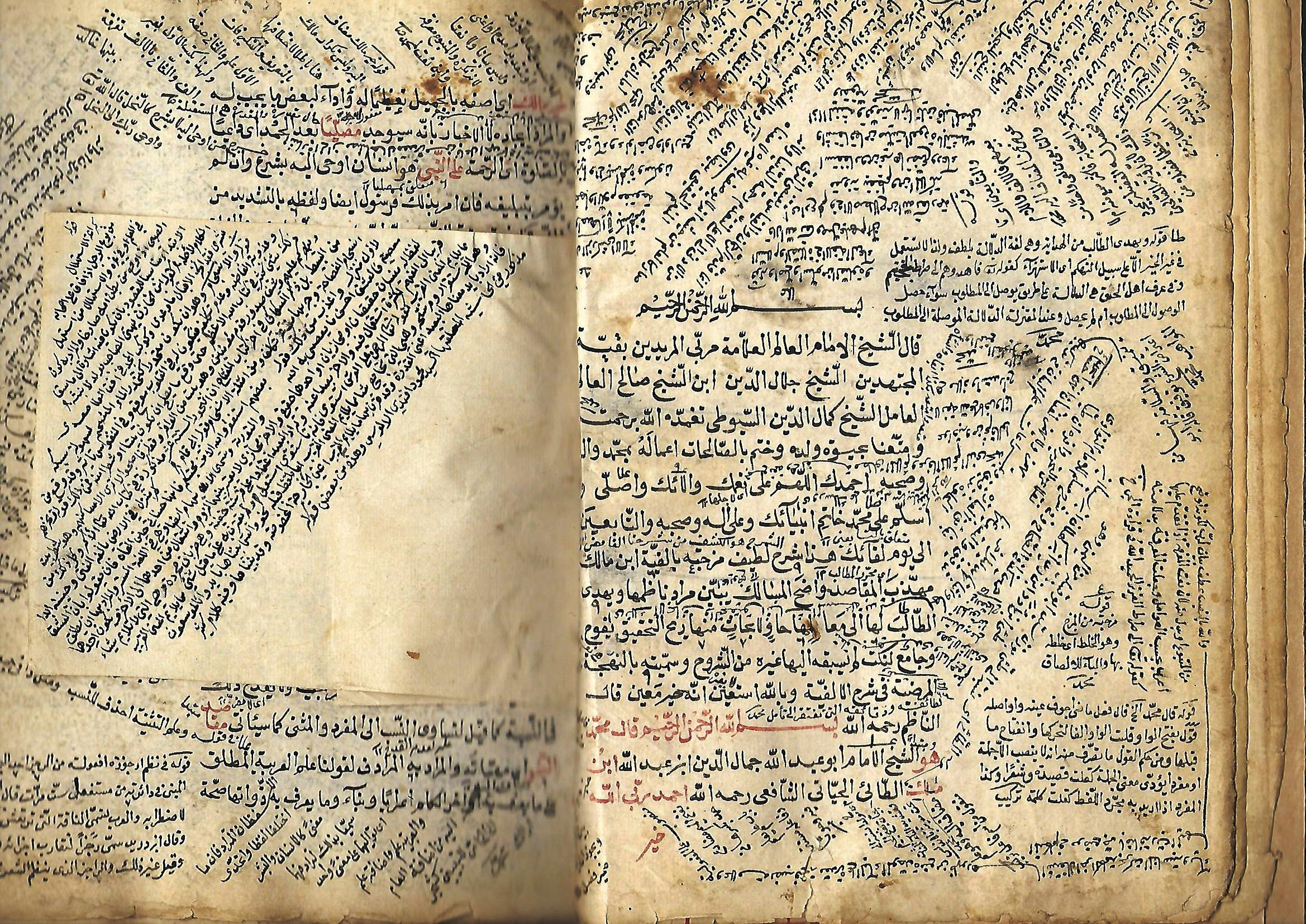
Al-Alfiyya of Ibn Malik

== French conquest of Algeria ==
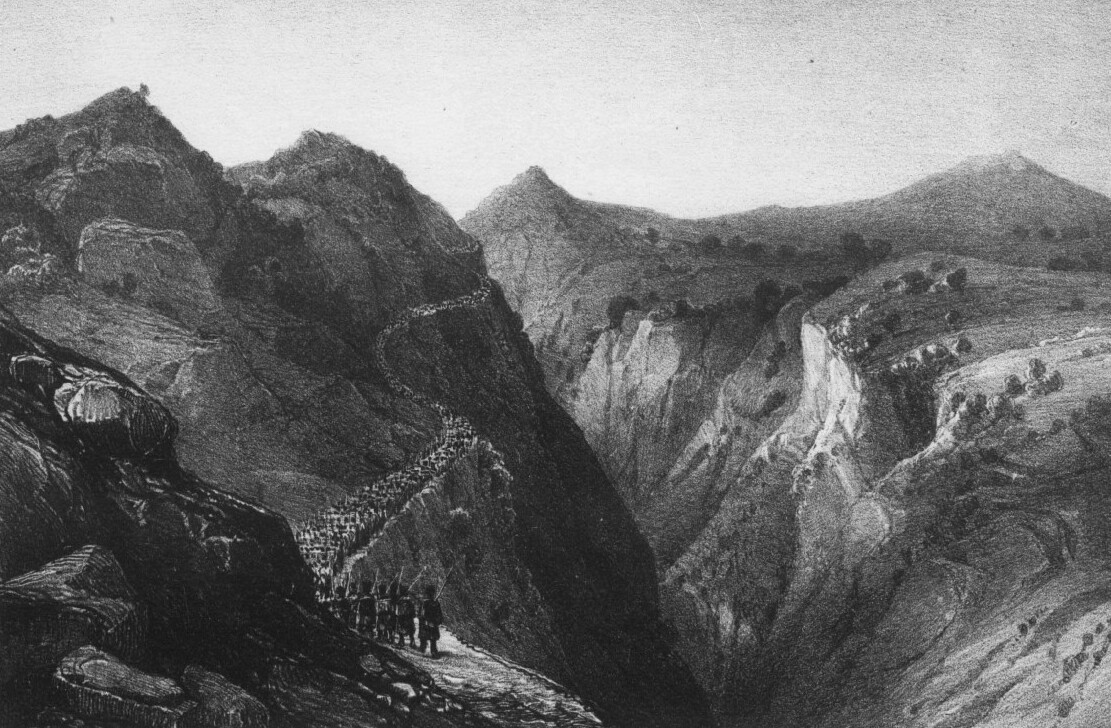
Expedition of the Col des Beni Aïcha (1837)

Zawiyet Sidi Boushaki played a crucial role in the resistance movement of the Kabyles of this area against the French invasion of Algeria since the latter started in 1830, and the zawiya's Murids took part in several decisive battles, including:

- Shipwreck of Dellys (1830)
- Raid on Reghaïa (1837)
- Battle of the Col des Beni Aïcha (1837)
- Battle of Boudouaou (1837)
- Battle of the Issers (1837)
- Battle of the Col des Beni Aïcha (1846)
- Battle of the Col des Beni Aïcha (1871)
- Battle of Boudouaou (1871)

== Visit of Emir Abdelkader ==
During the visit of the Emir Abdelkader in 1839 to Kabylia, he made a stay in Dellys, where he went to visit the Zawiyet Sidi Amar Cherif on the mountain of Bouberrak, and had lunch there before going to spend the night with the Issers tribe.

During this visit to the Issers, the Emir also went to Zawiyet Sidi Boumerdassi near El-Djebil, and then continued his journey until he stopped at Col des Beni Aïcha, where he was warmly received by the Marabouts of Zawiyet Sidi Boushaki.

He was well received by the descendants of the theologian Sidi Boushaki, and gunshots were fired as a sign of rejoicing for his reassuring presence, then a meal of hospitality for distinguished guests was prepared for him, as his hosts thought that he was going to spend the night at the zawiya, but at nightfall he left to sleep elsewhere, so as to trick the possible spies that colonial France might have deployed there.

Before leaving the village of Soumâa, the Emir Abdelkader had announced to the inhabitants that peace with the French was fragile and would soon be broken at any time.

== Algerian Revolution ==
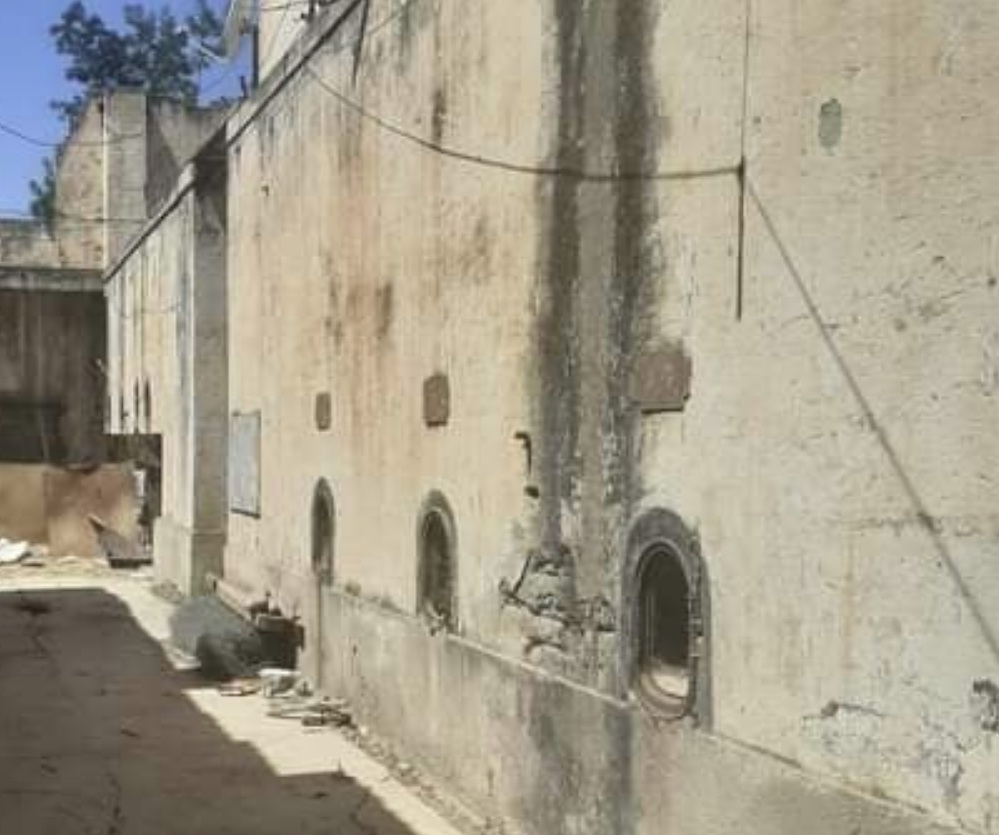
Ferme Gauthier

During the Algerian independence revolution, the zawiya was fully involved in the struggle for the freedom of the country, with the Shahid Yahia Boushaki (1935-1960) being one of the emblematic leaders of the revolution in the Fourth Historic Wilaya.

The zawiya continued to supervise the mosques in the villages of the Col des Beni Aïcha area, providing them with Imams so as to maintain the practice of Islamic worship (Ibadah) in such warlike circumstances.

This is how the mosque in the village of Aït Hamadouche had previously been framed by an Imam of the zawiya, and the same occurred with the villages of Djenah, Fekhara, Itoubal and Zaatra, until after the Soummam conference of 20 August 1956, when the entire region was devastated by the French Army in reprisal for the former's participation in the resistance.

The village of Soumâa was destroyed by French colonial artillery in April 1957, and the zawiya was razed by a shell fire that buried several Mujahideen who had taken refuge in it.

Several Murids of this zawiya were caught up and held in the torture center of Ferme Gauthier, near Oued Isser, where some of them suffered the most horrific torments and others died.

== Notable people ==
- Sidi Boushaki (1394-1453)
- Ali Boushaki (1855-1965)
- Mohamed Seghir Boushaki (1869-1959)
- Abderrahmane Boushaki (1896-1985)
- Brahim Boushaki (1912-1997)
- Yahia Boushaki (1935-1960)
- Mohamed Rahmoune (1940-2022)
- Cheikh Ali Boushaki (1812-1846)
- Cheikh Mohamed Boushaki (1834-1884)
- Omar Arar
- Ahmed Bourenane
- Mohamed Bourenane
- Salah Bouchatal

== Gallery ==
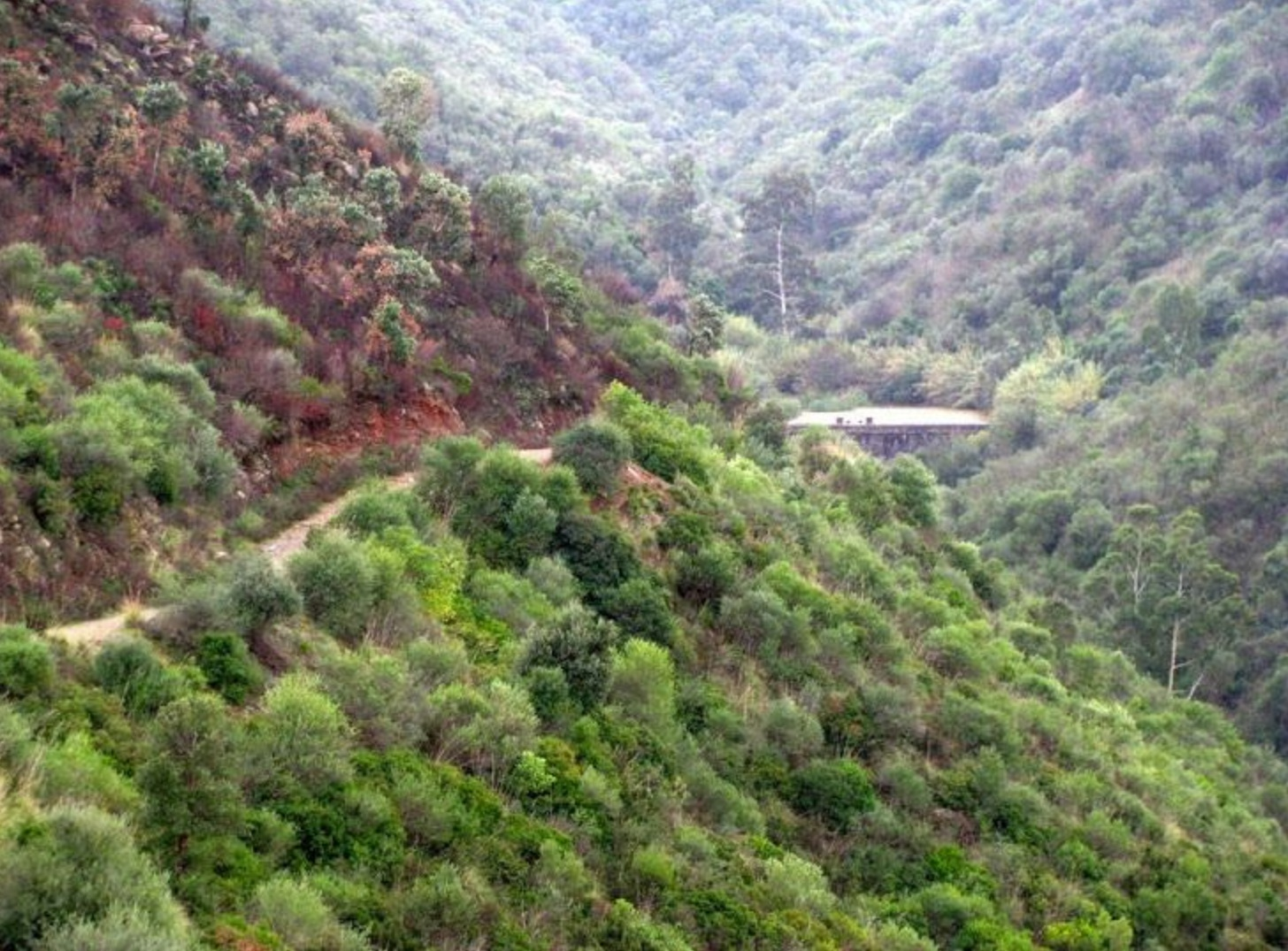
Meraldene Valley

== See also ==
- Algerian Islamic reference
- Sufism in Algeria
- Zawiyas in Algeria
- Qadiriyya
- Rahmaniyya
- Soumâa
- Meraldene
- Tabrahimt
- Gueddara
- Sidi Boushaki
- French conquest of Algeria
- Shipwreck of Dellys (1830)
- Battle of the Col des Beni Aïcha (1837)
- Battle of the Col des Beni Aïcha (1846)
- Mokrani Revolt
- Battle of the Col des Beni Aïcha (1871)
- Battle of Boudouaou (1871)
- Maximilien Joseph Schauenburg
- Jean-François Gentil
- Thomas Robert Bugeaud
- Algerian Revolution
