= Sufism in Algeria =

Sufism is considered an essential part of Islam in Algeria. It was suppressed by Salafists but in the present is regaining its influence as it existed before the Algerian Civil War. Sufis have considerable influence in both urban and rural Algerian Society. The history of Sufism in Algeria dates back around 1400 years, recognised as "Home of Sufi Marabouts". Most Algerians are followers and murids of Sufism, which has shaped the nation’s society and politics throughout its history. Sufism provides an important contribution to the stability of the country.

== Influence ==
Sufism is tightly bounded to the History of Algeria as it is said that the Ottoman governors of Algiers were traditionally crowned in the presence of a great Sufi Sheikh.

Before and after 1830, under the power of Emir Abdelkader, the Sufis saw their position in Algerian society consolidated and reinforced by the Algerian popular resistance against French invasion.

Many non-Sufi Muslims and Sufis united to face the Invasion of Algiers in 1830, the French conquest of Algeria and the hegemony of French Algeria.

== Sufi rituals and practices ==
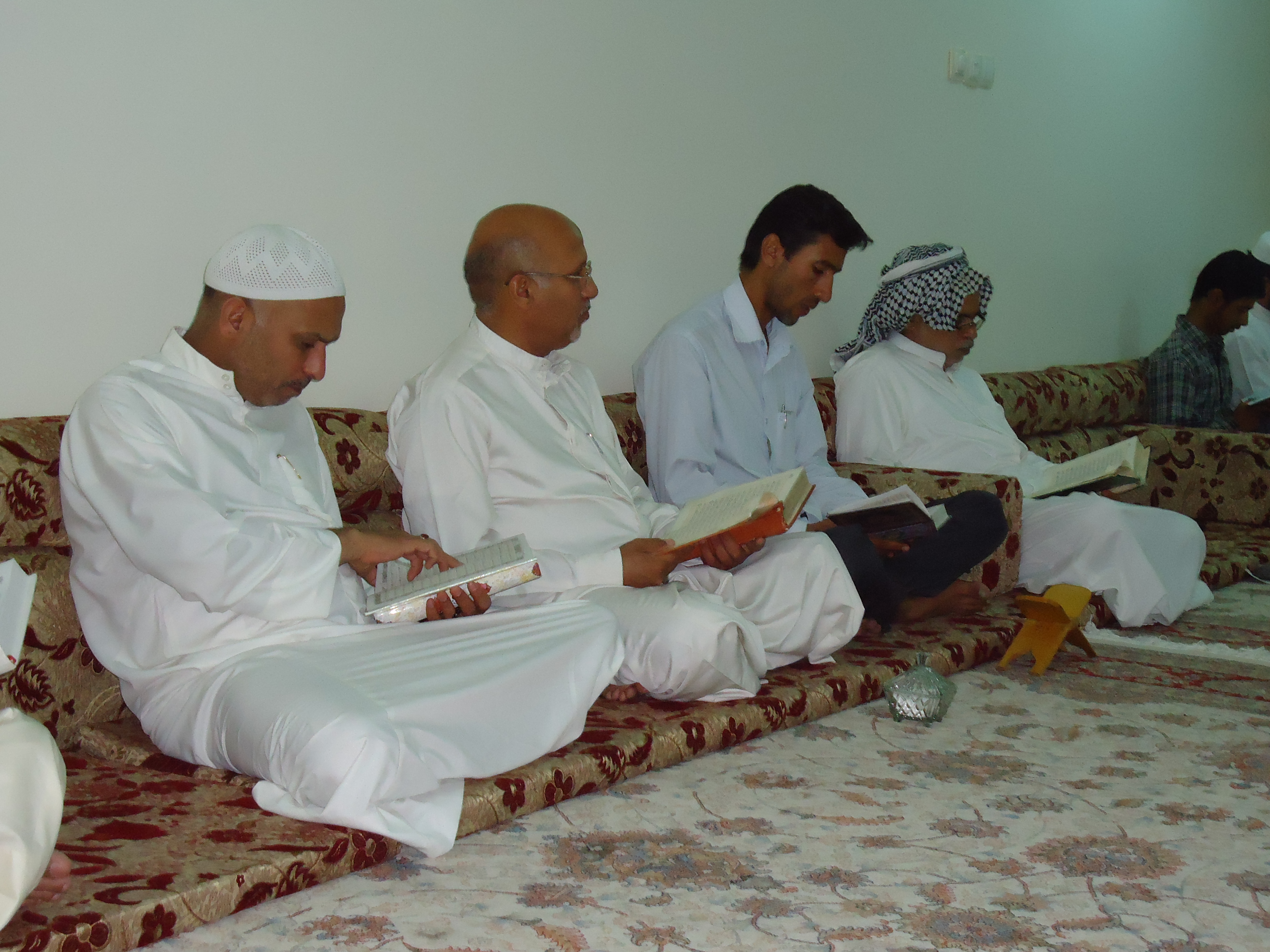
Hizb Rateb and Salka.

Ashewiq is a devotional Sufi music which is played and sung over the country according to different versions as Imzad.

Other Sufi practices includes dhikr and wird, construction of various Qubbas and Zawiyas to spread Islam.

The Rahmani Sufi order is one of the most dominant Sufi orders in Algeria, which is a branch of the Khalwati Tariqa and it is said to be influential to the present day.

Ashura, Mawlid, Mawsim, Sebiba and Tweeza are widely celebrated by the Sufis in Algeria.

The regular Sufi practice in many of the Zawiyas in Algeria sees the presence of participants to the Hizb Rateb and the Salka without performing any other Sama or Whirling.

The only music performed with the verbal Dhikr is Madih nabawi, Nasheed and Ashewiq, written and sung with rhythm and melody but without any musical instrument except Daf, by the poesy reciters and performers of Dhikr.

The anniversary of the birth and death of a Sufi Saint is observed annually in the so-called Mawsim.

Large numbers of Murids attend these ceremonies, which are festive occasions enjoyed by the Murids as well as Muslim scholars.

Many Murids, if not most, visit the graveside Maqams, some at least occasionally, many often, and an untold number rather regularly, throughout their lives.

People regularly visit these shrines to invoke by Tawassul the acceptance of their prayers to God (Allah) Almighty, and to offer votive prayers and donations.

== Involvement in politics and foreign policy ==
Official rulers of Algeria began with Sufi blessings when taking power claiming to have had the blessing of the marabouts and dervishes who endorsed the winner politicians, and the political governance always had a relationship of mutual patronage with Sufis.

The Algerian government is believed to utilise Sufism to promote regional diplomacy and lower tensions in West Africa. In May 2025, the spiritual leader of the Algerian branch of the Tijaniyyah order, Sheikh Ali Belarabi, travelled to Burkina Faso in a presential jet and official state delegation. Belarabi's meeting with Burkinabe officials was said to be aimed at defusing tensions in Algerian-Burkanibe relations, which worsened a month earlier when Algeria shot down a Malian drone and Mali's ally Burkina Faso withdrew its ambassador to Algeria and shuttered its airspace to Algerian civilian aircraft. Belarabi has also taken state visits to Nigeria and Senegal to improve bilateral relations with those countries.

== Impact of Sufism ==
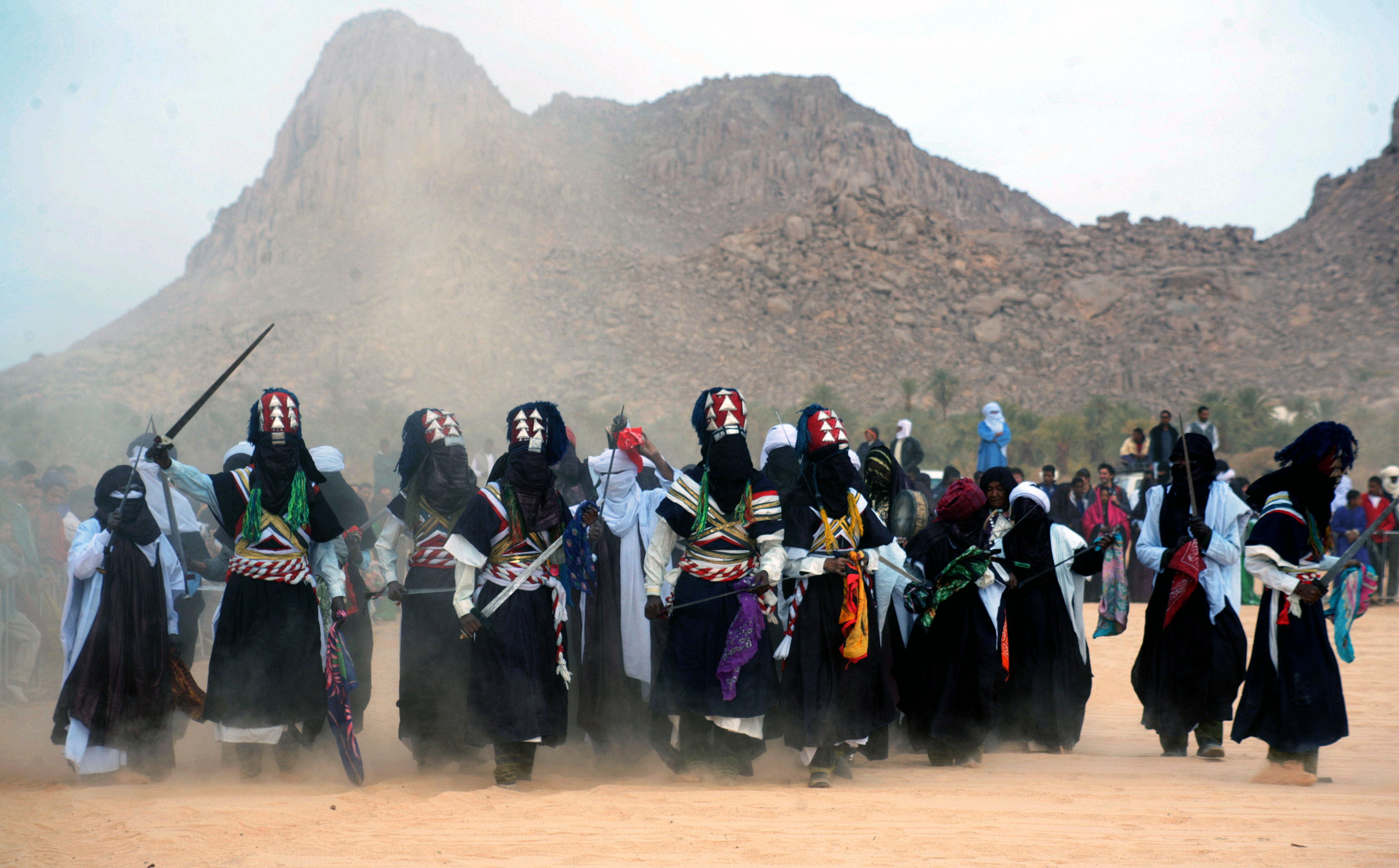
Sebiba

The massive geographic presence of Islam in Algeria can be explained by the tireless activity of Sufi Khatibs and Sheikhs and Murshids.

Sunni Sufism had left a prevailing impact on Algerian religious, cultural, and social life in this central region of Maghreb and North Africa.

The mystical form of Islam was introduced by Sufi saints and scholars traveling from all over continental Africa who were instrumental and influential in the social, economic, and philosophic development of Algeria.

Besides preaching in major cities and centers of intellectual thought, Sufis reached out to poor and marginalized rural communities and preached in local dialects such as Kabyle, Shilha, Mozabite, Shawiya versus Berber, and Arabic.

Sufism emerged as a "moral and comprehensive socio-religious force" that even influenced other cultural traditions such as Berbers culture.

Sufi traditions of devotional practices and modest living attracted people and their teachings of humanity, love for God and Prophet continue to be surrounded by mystical tales and folk songs today. The modern Algerian state promotion of Sufism as a moderate alternative to Salafism has also been framed around Sufi embrace of music and literature, contrasted with supposed Salafi ideological rigidity and denial of these vehicles for self-expression.

Sufis were firm in abstaining from religious and communal conflict and strived to be peaceful elements of civil society, and this attitude of accommodation, adaptation, piety, and charisma that continues to help Sufism remain as a pillar of mystical Islam in Algeria.

== Sufi orders ==
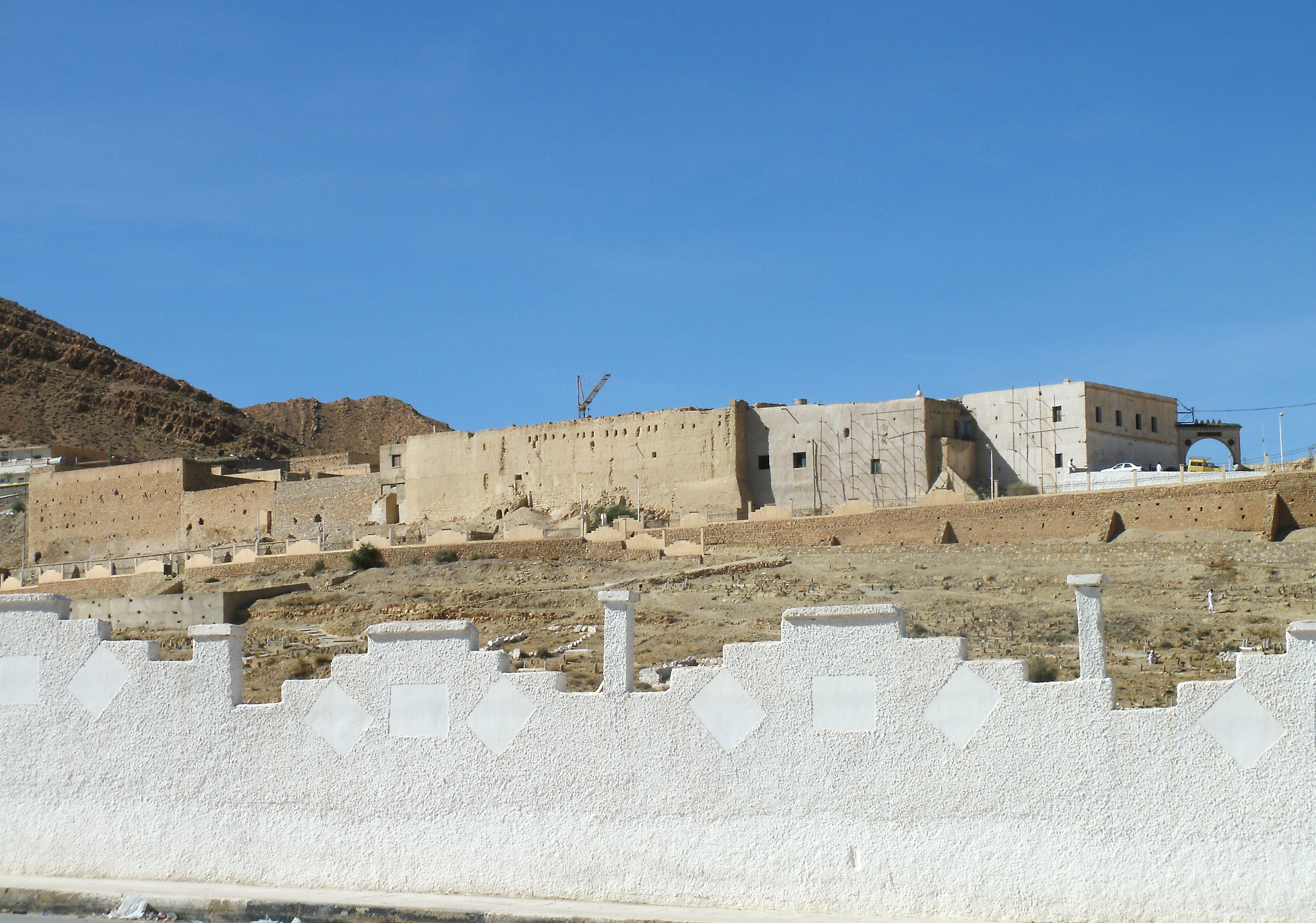
Rahmaniyya

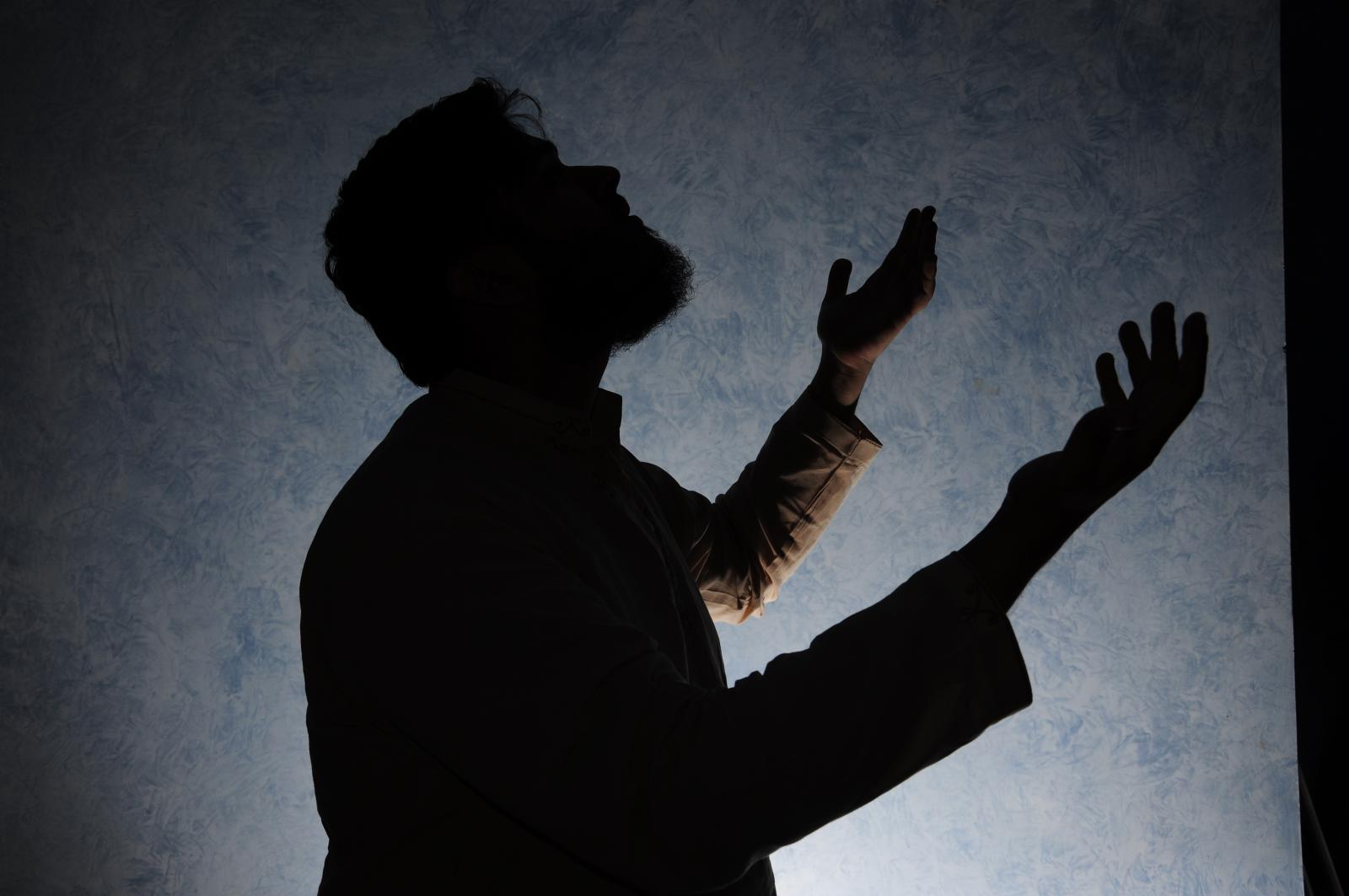
Raising hands in Dua

Many Sufi orders were widespread in Algeria in the late 1950s, including the following:

- Alawiyya
- Chabiyya
- Darqawiyya
- Dardouriyya
- Habibiyya
- Hansaliyya
- Isawiyya
- Karzaziyya
- Khalwatiyya
- Madyaniyya
- Nasiriyya
- Omariyya
- Ouazzaniyya
- Qadiriyya
- Rahmaniyya
- Senusiyya
- Shadhiliyya
- Sheikhiyya
- Taïbiyya
- Tijaniyya
- Youssoufiyya
- Zaïaniyya
- Zarrouqiyya

== List of Notable Algerian Sufis ==
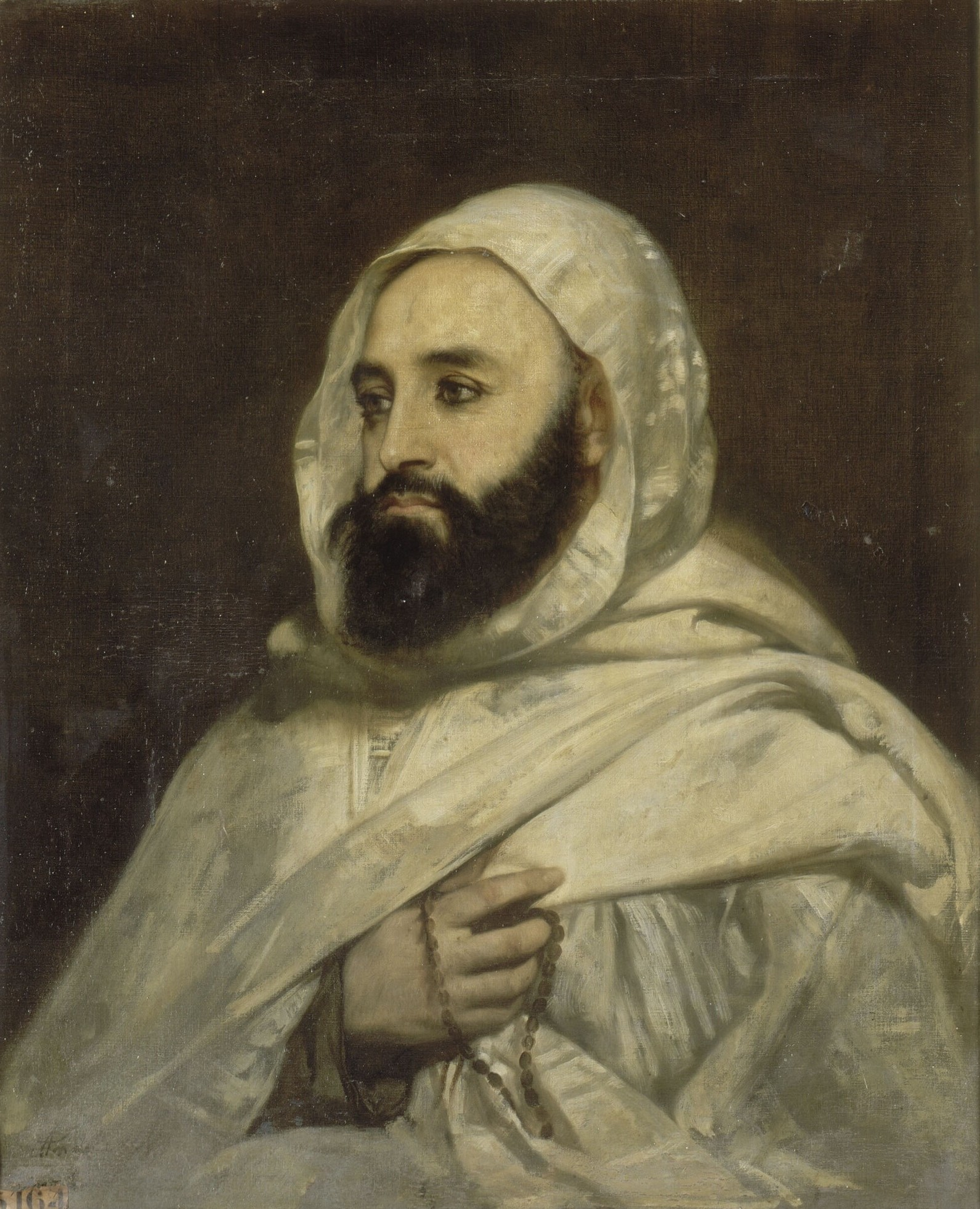
Emir Abdelkader

Algeria is a birthplace of many Sufis such as:

1. Abu Madyan (died 1198)
2. Ahmad al-Buni (d. 1225)
3. Mohamed al-Waghlissi (died 1241)
4. Ahmed al-Ghobrini (died 1304)
5. Mansour al-Mechedelli (died 1331)
6. Mohamed al-Melikechi (died 1339)
7. Ahmed al-Ilouli (died 1359)
8. Abderrahmane al-Waghlissi (died 1384)
9. Ali al-Menguellati (died 1412)
10. Sidi El Houari (died 1439)
11. Mansour al-Menguellati (died 1442)
12. Sidi Boushaki (died 1453)
13. Sidi Abd al-Rahman al-Tha'alibi (died 1479)
14. Sidi Ahmed Zouaoui (died 1488)
15. Sidi M'hamed Bou Qobrine (died 1793)
16. Sidi Ahmad al-Tijani (d.1815)
17. Ahmed bin Salem (d. after 1846)
18. Sidi Muhammad ibn Ali al-Sanusi (d. 1859)
19. Emir Abdelkader (d. 1883)
20. Lalla Zaynab (d. 1904)
21. Ahmad al-Alawi (d. 1934)
22. Abdul Baqi Miftah (b. 1952)

== Gallery ==
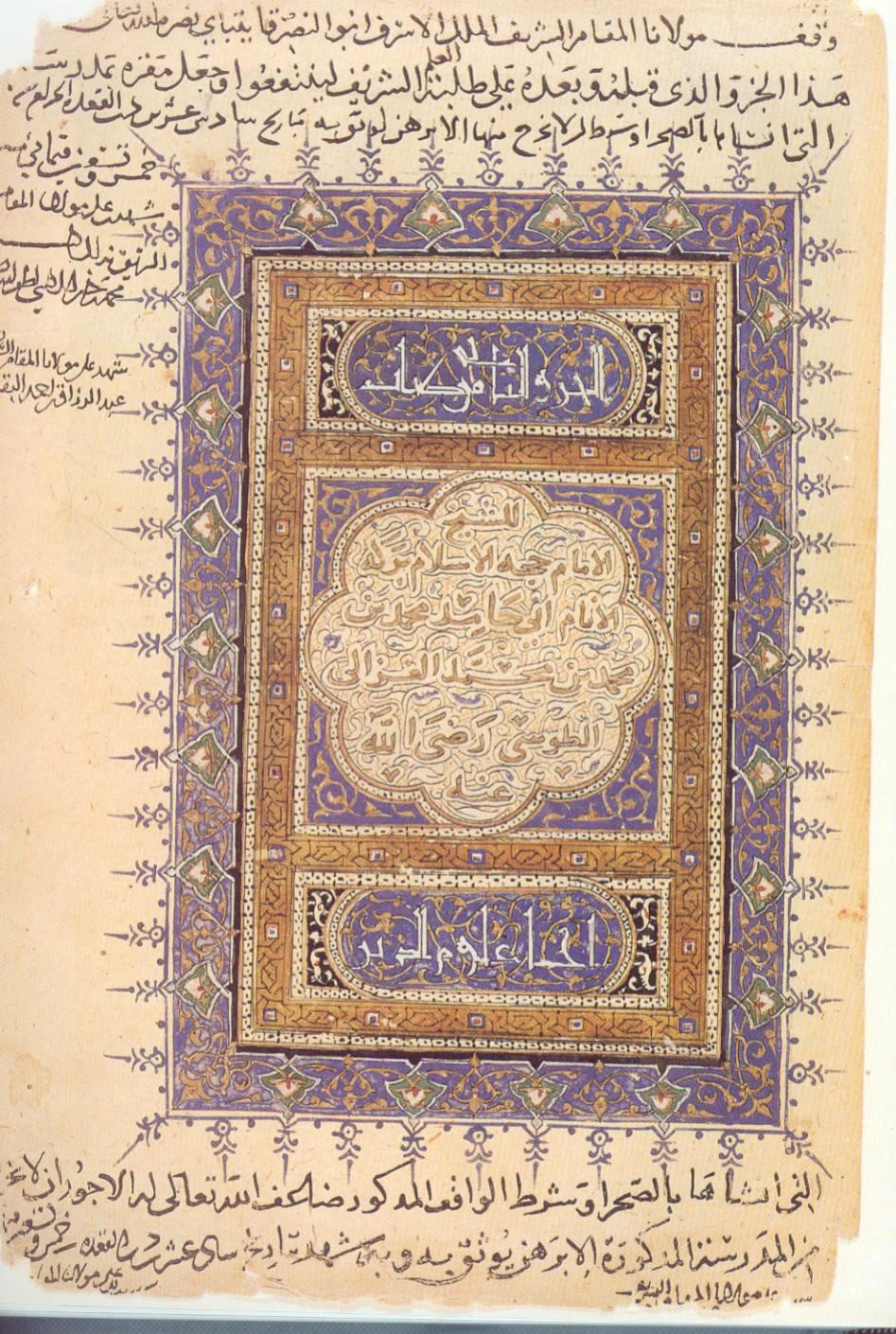
The Revival of the Religious Sciences

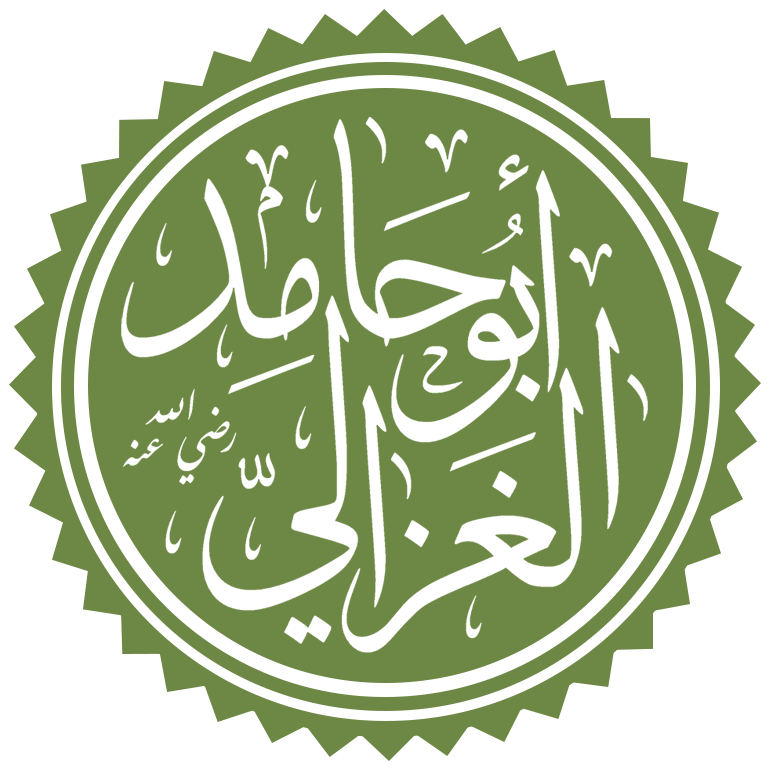
Al-Ghazali

== See also ==
- Ministry of Religious Affairs and Endowments in Algeria
- Algerian Islamic reference
- Islam in Algeria
- Religion in Algeria
- Mosques in Algeria
- Hizb Rateb
- Zawiyas in Algeria
- Muftis in Algeria
- Malikism in Algeria
- Ashura in Algeria
- Mawlid in Algeria
