= Soumâa =

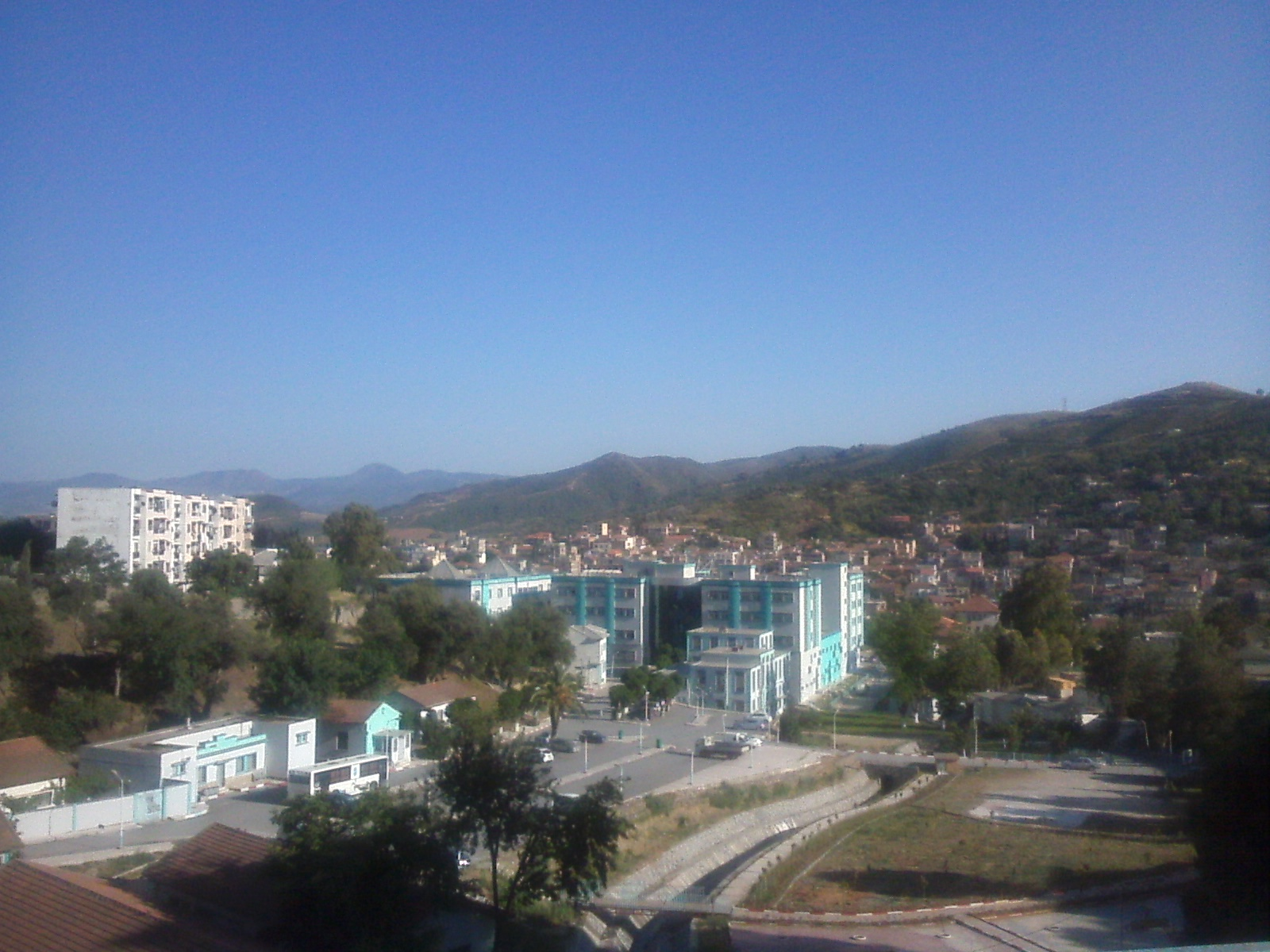
- Nickname: Thala Oufella
- Motto: الصومعة - ثالة أوفلة
- Interactive map of Soumâa
- Coordinates: 36.705°N 3.562°E
- Commune: Thénia
- District: Thénia District
- Province: Boumerdès Province
- Region: Kabylie
- Country: Algeria

Area
  - Total: 5 km^{2} (1.9 sq mi)

Dimensions
  - Length: 2.5 km (1.6 mi)
  - Width: 2 km (1.2 mi)
- Elevation: 400 m (1,300 ft)
- Time zone: UTC+01:00
- Area code: 35005
- Website: thenia.net

Soumâa or Thala Oufella is a village in the Boumerdès Province in Kabylie, Algeria.

== Location ==
The village is surrounded by Meraldene River and Isser River, and also the town of Thenia in the Khachna mountain range.

== Zawiya ==
- Zawiyet Sidi Boushaki

== History ==
This village has experienced the facts of several historical events:

- Battle of the Col des Beni Aïcha (1837)
- Battle of the Col des Beni Aïcha (1846)
- Battle of the Col des Beni Aïcha (1871)

== Notable people ==
- Sidi Boushaki, Algerian theologian.
- Cheikh Ali Boushaki, Algerian leader.
- Cheikh Mohamed Boushaki, Algerian leader.
- Abdenour Boushaki, Algerian politician.
- Abderrahmane Boushaki, Algerian leader.
- Ali Boushaki, Algerian theologian.
- Brahim Boushaki, Algerian theologian.
- Ciria, Berber leader.
- Dius, Berber leader.
- Feriel Boushaki, Algerian artist.
- Firmus, Berber leader.
- Gildo, Berber leader.
- Mascezel, Berber leader.
- Mazuca, Berber leader.
- Mohamed Rahmoune, Algerian politician.
- Mohamed Seghir Boushaki, Algerian politician.
- Nubel, Berber leader.
- Salah Bouchatal, Algerian politician.
- Sammac, Berber leader.
- Tarek Boushaki, Algerian academician.
- Yahia Boushaki (Shahid), Algerian politician.
