= Sidi Boushaki =

Maliki Islamic scholar (1394–1453)

Sidi Brahim Boushaki
- إبراهيم بن فايد الزواوي
- Born: Ibrahim Ibn Faïd Ez-Zaouaoui; 1394 CE/796 AH; Soumâa, Thenia, Algeria
- Died: 1453 CE/857 AH; Soumâa, Thenia, Algeria
- Education: Zawiyet Sidi Boushaki
- Occupations: Imam; faqih; linguist; Sufi
- Years active: 1394–1453
- Theological work
- Era: Zayyanid dynasty; Hafsid dynasty; Kingdom of Koukou
- Language: Amazigh–Arabic
- Tradition or movement: Sufism in Algeria; Qadiriyya
- Main interests: Tafsir; Maliki fiqh; Arabic language; Arabic grammar

Sidi Boushaki or Ibrahim Ibn Faïd Ez-Zaouaoui (Arabic: إبراهيم بن فايد الزواوي) (1394 CE/796 AH – 1453 CE/857 AH) was a Maliki theologian born near the town of Thenia, 54 km (34 mi) east of Algiers. He was raised in a very spiritual environment with high Islamic values and ethics within the Algerian Islamic reference.

== Birth and lineage ==
Sidi Boushaki Ez-Zaouaoui was born in 1394 CE in the Col des Beni Aïcha, at the village of Soumâa within the region of Tizi Naïth Aïcha, in the Khachna massif, an extension of Djurdjura.

His extended lineage is Abu Ishaq Ibrahim bin Faïd bin Moussa bin Omar bin Saïd bin Allal bin Saïd al-Zawawi.

== Biography ==
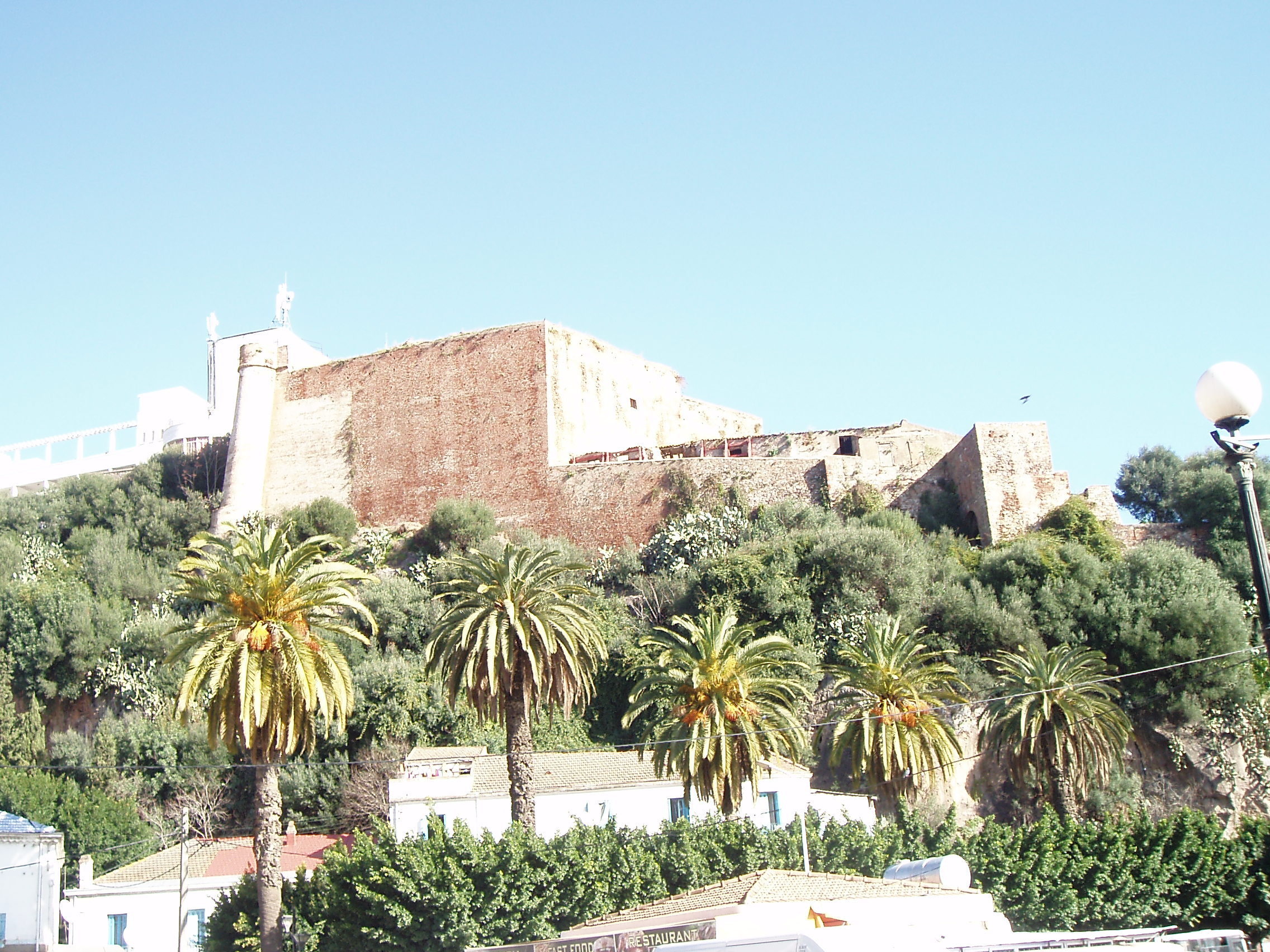
Casbah of Bejaïa

He began his studies in the village of Thala Oufella (Soumâa) in Thénia in 1398 CE, before joining Béjaïa in 1404 CE, very young, to continue his studies.

There he studied the Quran and the Maliki fiqh as a pupil with Ali Menguelleti, a recognized theologian from Kabylie.

Béjaïa was then at the beginning of the fifteenth century a religious center and a place of influence of Sufism.

He made his destination in 1415 to Tunis, where he deepened his knowledge of Maliki Madhhab.

There he studied the tafsir of the Quran at the judge Abu Abdallah Al Kalchani, and he received the Maliki fiqh from Yaakub Ez-Zaghbi.

He was a student of Abdelwahed Al Fariani in the foundations (Oussoul) of Islam.

He returned in 1420 to the mountains of Béjaïa where he deepened in Arabic at Abd El Aali Ibn Ferradj.

He went to Constantine in 1423 where he lived for many years, and he received the teachings in the Muslim faith (Aqidah) and logic in "Abu Zeid Abderrahmane", nicknamed "El Bez".

He studied prose, verse, fiqh and the majority of the theological sciences of the time at Ibn Marzuq El Hafid (1365 - 1439), the Maghreb and Tlemcen scholar who had visited Constantine to preach his knowledge, not to be confused with his father Ibn Marzuq El Khatib (1310 - 1379).

He joined Mecca for pilgrimage and study, then moved to Damascus where he attended the teachings of Imam Ibn al-Jazari in the sciences of the Qur'an.

He died in 1453, and was buried in the Thenia Mountains near Zawiyet Sidi Boushaki in his native Kabyle tribe of the Igawawen

== Zawiya ==
Back in Kabylia during the last few years of his life, Sidi Boushaki then founded a zawiya in which he taught his disciples (murids) according to the Qadiriyya Sufi brotherhood of Sunni Sufism.

This zawiya was a place of intellectual and spiritual influence throughout the lower Kabylia by its teachings and initiation courses provided in this region surrounded by Oued Isser and Oued Meraldene in front of Mediterranean Sea.

The Sufi order of Qadiriyya was hardly followed in this zawiya for three centuries until the tariqa Rahmaniyya took over in the Algérois region and Kabylia as a model of the ascetic course.

== Works ==
His works cover several aspects of the Islamic sciences, including:

=== Exegesis and Qur'anic sciences (al-tafsîr wa al-qirâ'ât) ===
- Tafsir al-Zawawi is an interpretation (tafsir) of the Quran (Arabic: تفسير الزواوي).

=== Islamic Law (fiqh) ===
- Tuhfat Al-Mushtaq is a brief explanation of Mukhtasar Khalil in Maliki jurisprudence (Arabic: تحفة المشتاق في شرح مختصر خليل).
- Facilitating the Path for an extract of the flowers of Rawd Khalil is an explanation of Mukhtasar Khalil's summary of Maliki jurisprudence (Arabic: تسهيل السبيل لمقتطف أزهار روض خليل).
- Flood of the Nile is an explanation of Mukhtasar Khalil's summary of Maliki jurisprudence (Arabic: فيض النيل).

=== Arabic Language ===
- Poem in explaining the rules of grammatical parsing of the book Expressing the Arabic grammar rules on Arabic grammar by Ibn Hisham al-Ansari (Arabic: نظم قواعد الإعراب لابن هشام).
- Talkhis al-Talkhis is an explanation of the book Talkhis al-Miftah on rhetoric, meanings and statement (Arabic: تلخيص التلخيص).
- Book explaining the book Al-Alfiyya of Ibn Malik on syntax by Ibn Malik (Arabic: شرح ألفية ابن مالك).

== Gallery ==
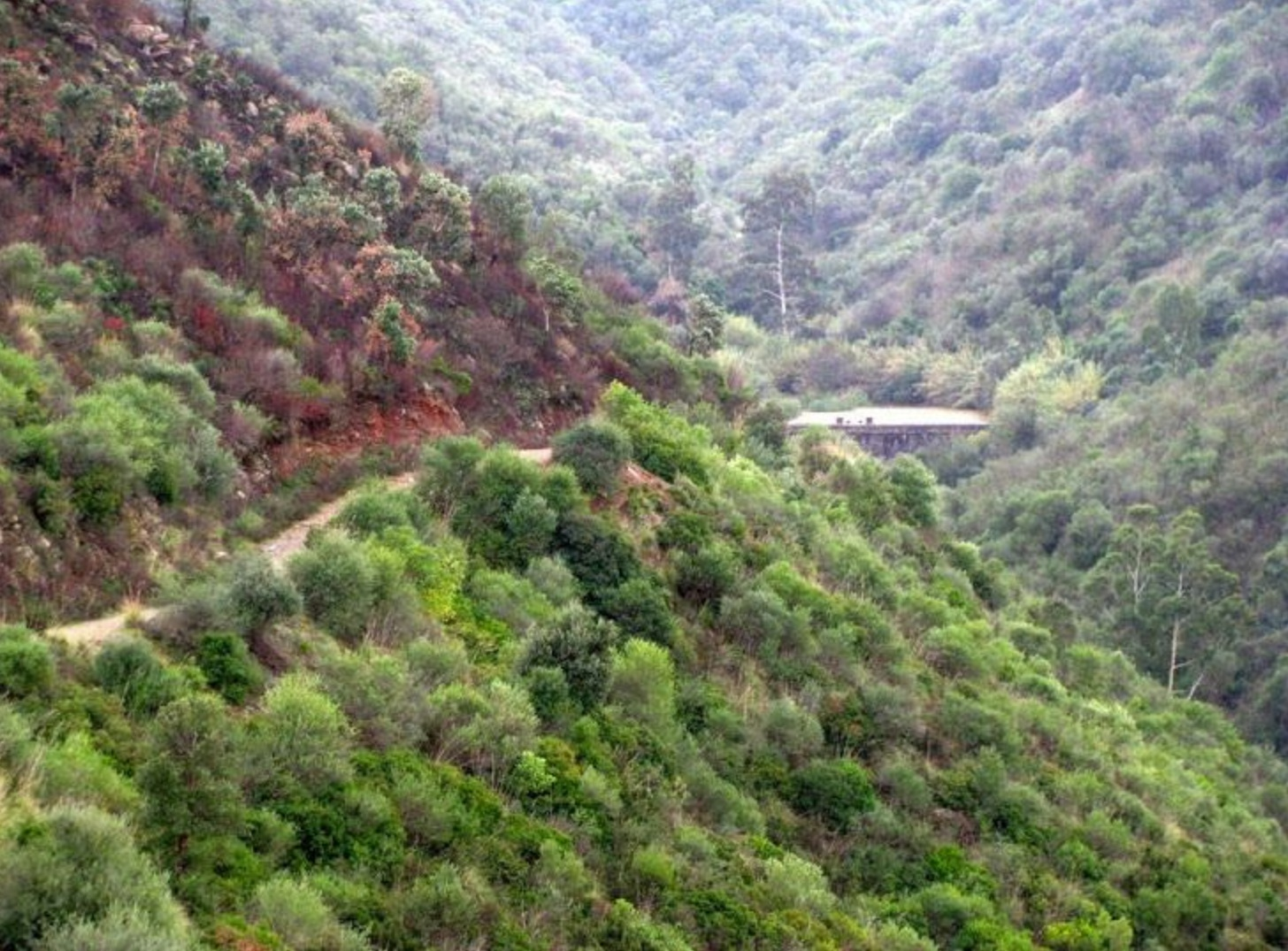
Meraldene valley and dam on Meraldene River

== See also ==
- Algerian Islamic reference
- Sidi Abderrahmane Thaalibi
- Zawiyas in Algeria
- Malikism in Algeria
- Sufism in Algeria
- List of Arabic-language poets
- List of Quran interpreters
- List of Islamic jurists
- List of linguists
- Muslim scholarship (disambiguation)

== Sources ==
- Poem in explaining the rules of grammatical parsing by Ibn Hisham al-Ansari (نظم قواعد الإعراب لابن هشام للمؤلف سيدي بوسحاقي)
