= Rahmaniyya =

Sufi mystic order in Sunni Islam

The Raḥmâniyya (Arabic: الرحمانية) is an Algerian Sufi order (tariqa or brotherhood) founded by Kabyle religious scholar Muḥammad ibn ʿAbd al-Raḥman al-Azhari Bu Qabrayn in the 1770s. It was initially a branch of the Khalwatîya (Arabic: الخلوتية) established in Kabylia region. However, its membership grew unwaveringly elsewhere in Algeria and in North Africa.

== Founder ==
Muhammad ibn 'Abd al-Rahman al-Azharî (Arabic: محمد بن عبد الرحمن الأزهري), more commonly known as Bû Qabrayn (Arabic: بوقبرين, "the man with two tombs"), was an 18th-century Algerian Islamic scholar, saint and a Sufi mystic. He was born between the years 1715 and 1729 into the Berber Ait Ismâ'îl (Bounouh/Boghni/Tizi Ouzou) tribe of the Qashtula (Igudjdale, Iguechtolen Confederation), in Kabylia. He studied first in a nearby zawiya in his hometown of Jurjura. Then, he went on studying at the Great Mosque in Algiers before undertaking his journey to Mašriq in 1739–40 to perform the hajj.

Following his stay in the Hijaz, Bu Qubrayn settled in Egypt to attain greater knowledge at the Al-Azhar mosque in Cairo. This is where he was initiated to the Sufi order of khalwatîya under Muḥammad ibn Salim al-Hifnawi (1689-1767/8), the leader of the Egyptian khalwatîya and rector of al-Azhar. As part of his learning with al-Hifnawi, Bu Qubrayn traveled extensively to teach ḫalwatîya doctrines, including in Darfur for six years and as far as India.

After three decades, Muhammad ibn 'Abd al-Rahman returned to his village Jurjura in Algeria sometime between 1763 and 1770. There, he founded a school and zawiya in the 1770s and initiated the Kabyles into the tarîqa. He rapidly attracted local notables and developed his zawiya into a prestigious center of learning, before his death in 1793/4.

== Propagation and influence ==
The Raḥmâniyya grew rapidly beyond Kabylia region, in eastern and south-eastern Algeria where it competed with other Sufi orders such as Qâdiriyya or Tijâniyya. However, within Kabylia, its influence was almost exclusive of any other order. In 1851, French military authorities estimated the membership of the order to 295,000 members.

After the death of Bu Qubrayn, his successor 'Alî ibn 'Îsâ al-Maghribî remained the undisputed leader of the order until 1835. The leadership was then more disputed until 1860, which led to the division of the Raḥmâniyya into independent branches. But Muḥammad Amezzyân ibn al-Haddâd of Saddûk took over in 1860, bringing unity and dynamism back to the order for a decade.

The Raḥmâniyya, along with other Sufi orders, fulfilled an important role as education centers and charitable organizations. The zawiyas offered different teachings and supports across the order, but it included studies on religion, grammar, religious law, geography, and mathematics.

== Role in the uprising of 1871 ==
The Raḥmâniyya and Shaykh al-Haddâd [fr] played a major role during the Algerian uprising of 1871. After the transition from a military regime to a civilian regime, the Crémieux decree, and the French defeat in the Franco-Prussian War, Shaykh Mokrani launched the revolt against French authorities in March 1871. But the insurrection really gained ground when Shaykh al-Haddâd proclaimed the holy war against the French in April. Soon, around 250 tribes and 150,000 combattants rose from everywhere in Kabylia, especially members of the Raḥmâniyya. However, Kabyle troops suffered decisive defeats in June and July, and the repression that followed was severe.

== Evolution after 1871 ==
After the insurrection of 1871, the main zawiya definitively lost control over the other branches of the order, which were now following and adapting the Raḥmâniyya teachings more or less independently. The order lost some of its influence but remained vigorous. In 1897, the Raḥmâniyya was the largest Sufi order in Algeria, with 177 zawiyas and over 155,000 members.

In the 20th century, Sufism declined in Algeria for multiple reasons. First, the French colonial authorities both used Sufi orders and tried to weaken them. Second, reformers from the Islamic Modernism movement attacked Sufis, claiming they were into deviational and heretical practices, superstitions keeping people ignorant. Also, under the presidencies of Ahmed Ben Bella (1963-1965) and Houari Boumedienne (1965-1978), Sufi orders were further weakened by governments trying to increase their control of Algerian society. Sufi shaykhs were often subject to house arrest, and Sufi-owned properties were nationalized. However, the Raḥmâniyya experienced a renewed activity after the independence, and around 1950, it had around 230,000 members, mostly Berbers, namely almost half of the 500,000 members in Algerian Sufi orders.

The situation of Sufi orders improved under the presidency of Chadli Benjedid (1979-1992), who returned some of the properties previously nationalized. Sufi orders managed to resume their activities and the number of their followers started to increase again. The Raḥmâniyya and other Sufi orders were leaders of fostering political dialogue between the state and growing Islamist opposition, while the order's zawiya leaders maintained a their roles as key players in Algeria's rural constituencies.

However, this reversalal ended during the Algerian civil war in the 1990s. After the military took control of the state, they sanctioned not only Salafi and Wahhabi groups but also Sufi orders. At the end of the war, President Abdelaziz Bouteflika (1999-2019) endeavored to support "Sufism as a more moderate alternative to more radical Salafis and more conservative Wahhabis".

Today, Sufi orders such as the Raḥmâniyya survive in Algeria despite their reduced influence in Algerian society. Sufism is viewed positively, even though most Algerian youth don't practice what they don't consider a modern lifestyle. And in Kabylia, where the Raḥmāniyya is stronger, rates of affiliation are higher than in other regions.

== Practices of Raḥmâniyya ==
The principles of Raḥmâniyya are fairly egalitarian and democratic, which partly explains its success in Kabylia. The order recognizes local saints and integrates them in its Islamic teachings, achieving the synthesis between local traditions and Islamic orthodoxy. Its practices are simple and accessible, as they do not require an extensive knowledge of the Quran beyond a few important verses. Scholars and brothers widely use the Kabyle language and do not need a deep understanding of Arabic.

A fundamental practice involves teaching the mûrîd (Arabic: موريد "the disciple") an array of seven "names". The first one consists in repeating lâ ilâha ilal 'llâhu (Arabic: لا إله إلا الله "there is no god except God") between 12,000 and 70,000 times in a day and night. If the mûršîd (Arabic: مورشيد "the spiritual guide") is satisfied with the mûrîd's progress, then the mûrîd is allowed to continue with the six remaining names: Allâh (Arabic: الله "God") three times; huwa (Arabic: هو "He is"), ḥaqq (Arabic: الحق "The Absolute Truth") three times; ḥayy (Arabic: الحى "The Ever- Living) three times; qayyûm (Arabic: القيوم "The Sustainer, The Self Subsisting") three times; qahhâr (Arabic: القهار "The Ever-Dominating").

== Organization of the Raḥmâniyya order ==
The Raḥmâniyya is organized following a hierarchy common in Sufi orders. Teaching and practicing are conducted in zawiyas under the direction of a shaykh (شيخ, šaiḫ, or religious scholar or master), assisted by a khalifa (ḫalifa or lieutenant) or a naib (نائب, nāʾib, or deputy), The muqaddams (representatives, delegates or local chiefs) and finally the ikhwan (إخوان, iḫwan, or brothers) constitute the bottom of the hierarchy.

== Sheikhs ==
Sheikhs of Tariqa Rahmaniyya
#	Sheikhs	From	To
01	Sidi M'hamed Bou Qobrine	1774	1793
02	Mohamed Lamali	1793	1830
03	Hmida Lamali	1830	1863
04	Sheikh Kacimi	1863	1897
05	Zaynab Kacimi	1897	1904
06	Mohamed Kacimi (Sufi)	1904	1913
07	Mokhtar Kacimi	1913	1915
08	Belkacem Kacimi	1915	1927
09	Ahmed Kacimi	1927	1928
10	Mostafa Kacimi	1928	1970
11	Hassan Kacimi	1970	1987
12	Khalil Kacimi	1987	1994
13	Mohamed Mamoun Kacimi	1994	2022

== Famous Zawiyas ==
- Zawiyet El Hamel
- Zawiyet Sidi Amar Cherif
- Zawiyet Sidi Boumerdassi
- Zawiyet Sidi Boushaki
- Zawiya Thaalibia
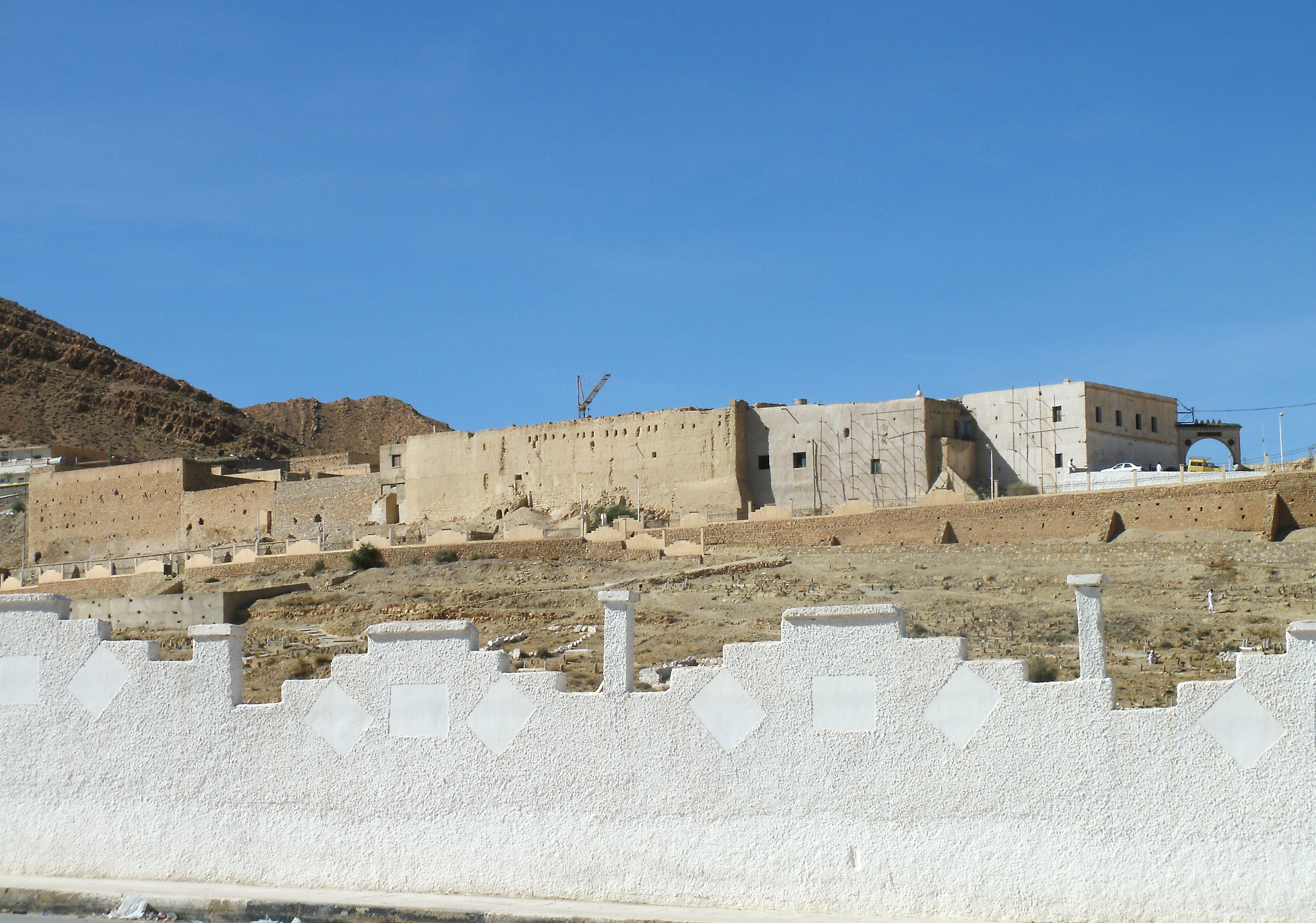
Zawiyet El Hamel

== Prominent Raḥmâniyya Sufis ==
- Abderrahmane Boushaki (1896-1985)
- Ahmed bin Salem (born 1802)
- Ali Boushaki (1855-1965)
- Brahim Boushaki (1912-1997)
- Shaykh al-Haddad [fr] (1790-1873)
- Lalla Zaynab (1850-1904)
- Mohamed Rahmoune (1940–2022)
- Mohamed Seghir Boushaki (1869–1959)
- Mohand al-Hosin [fr] (1836-1901)
- Yahia Boushaki (1935–1960)

== Bibliography ==
- Benaissa, O., "Le soufisme algérien à l'époque coloniale", in: Horizons Maghrébins - Le droit à la mémoire, N°41, 1999. Jorge Luis Borges et l'héritage littéraire arabo-musulman / Le soufisme en Occident Musulman. pp. 91–103; doi:10.3406/horma.1999.1843
- Clancy-Smith, J. A., "Between Cairo and the Algerian Kabylia: the Rahmaniyya tariqa, 1715-1800", in: Muslim Travellers, Pilgrimage, migration, and the religious imagination, Edited by Dale F. Eickelman and James Piscatori. Published by Routledge, 2013
- Jong, F. de, "K̲h̲alwatiyya", in: Encyclopaedia of Islam, Second Edition, Edited by: Bearman, P., Bianquis, Th., Bosworth, C. E., van Donzel, E., Heinrichs, W.P. First published online: 2012. First print edition: ISBN 9789004161214, 1960-2007
- Khemissi, H., Larémont, R. R., & Eddine, T. T., (2012) "Sufism, Salafism and state policy towards religion in Algeria: a survey of Algerian youth", The Journal of North African Studies, 17:3, 547–558, doi:10.1080/13629387.2012.675703
- Lacoste-Dujardin, C., Dictionnaire de la culture berbère en Kabylie. Edition La Découverte, 2005
- Margoliouth, D.S., "Raḥmāniyya", in: Encyclopaedia of Islam, Second Edition, Edited by: Bearman, P., Bianquis, Th., Bosworth, C. E., van Donzel, E., Heinrichs, W.P. First published online: 2012. First print edition: ISBN 9789004161214, 1960-2007
- Nadir, A., "La fortune d'un ordre religieux algérien vers la fin du XIXe siècle", in: Le Mouvement social, Oct. - Dec., 1974, No. 89, pp. 59–84
- Salhi, M. B., Confrérie religieuse et champ religieux en Grande-Kabylie au milieu du XXe siècle: la rahmaniyya, in: Annuaire de l'Afrique du Nord, Centre national de la recherche scientifique; Institut de recherches et d'études sur le monde arabe et musulman (IREMAM) (éds.), Paris, Editions du CNRS, 1996, pp. 253–269.
- Salhi, M. B., La tariqa Rahmaniya De l'avènement à l'insurrection de 1871. Published by: Haut Commissariat à l'Amazighité, 2008
- Salhi, M. B., "L'insurrection de 1871", in : Histoire de l'Algérie à la période coloniale : 1830-1962, Sous la direction de Bouchène, A., Peyroulou, J.-P., Tengour, O. S., Thénault, S. Edition La Découverte, 2014, pp. 103–109.
- Yacono, X., "Kabylie : L'insurrection de 1871", in: Encyclopédie berbère [En ligne], 26 | 2004, document K08, mis en ligne le 01 juin 2011. URL: http://journals.openedition.org/ encyclopedieberbere/1410; doi:10.4000/encyclopedieberbere.1410

== See also ==
- Khalwati order
- Sufism
- List of Sufi orders
- Zaouïa de Bounouh
