= Nass al-Houdhour =

Rank of Quran reciters

The Nass al-Houdhour (Arabic: ناس الحضور) are second rank Hezzabin reciting the Hizb Rateb and Salka in mosques and zawiyas in Algeria according to the Algerian Islamic reference under the supervision of the Ministry of Religious Affairs and Endowments.

== History ==
The mosques in Algeria employ many supporting Hezzabine called Nass al-Houdhour supervised by the Hezzabine and the Bash Hezzab along with other employees who take care of these buildings of Muslim ibadah.

Historically, the mosque of Djamaa el Kebir in the Casbah of Algiers was served by the mufti of Algiers assisted by two Imams, under their authority are placed a Moudaris, explicator of the Quran, a Bash Hezzab, head of the readers, six Hezzabine of first class, twelve Hezzabine of second class and four Nass al-Houdhour.

During the French colonization of Algeria, the annual salary of each one of the Hafiz belonging to Nass al-Houdhour was around 5,000 old French francs.

But this annual salary varied in value according to the competence of the Hafiz, the importance of the mosque in which he practiced his recitation (tilawa), as well as the importance of the city where he worked.

The reciters of the Nass al-Houdhour were considered as Talibes students paid for their sound performances and attendance in the large well-organized and structured mosques.

According to the circular of 17 May 1851 relating to the organization of Muslim worship (Ibadah) in Algeria, the Nass al-Houdhour were defined as trainee students designated as Tolba intended for the functions of Muslim worship, and who regularly attend public courses open in mosques.

While the salary payments attributed to senior staff of the Muslim religion, such as muftis and imams, were charged to the budget of the then colonized Algeria, salaries for lower staff, such as Nass al-Houdhour, and general mosque maintenance costs were borne by the local budget and municipalities.

== Functions ==
For qualified Tolbas like Nass al-Houdhour, the term “Houdhour” literally means “Assistance and Presence”, and this title applies to the meeting of tolba who assiduously follow the lessons of the mouderris in first-class Algerian mosques.

The Nass al-Houdhour are the Houfaz and Qaris who are part of this studious assembly, and who attend the reading and the explanations of the books most in honor among Muslims, like Sahih Bukhari.

The function of Nass al-Houdhour was an integral part of a clerical organization imposed on Algerian mosques and composed of muftis, imams, hezzabines, muezzins and other posts.

This structuring of the tasks of the Muslim cult was part of an institutional tendency opting for uniformity and hierarchy.

== Gallery ==
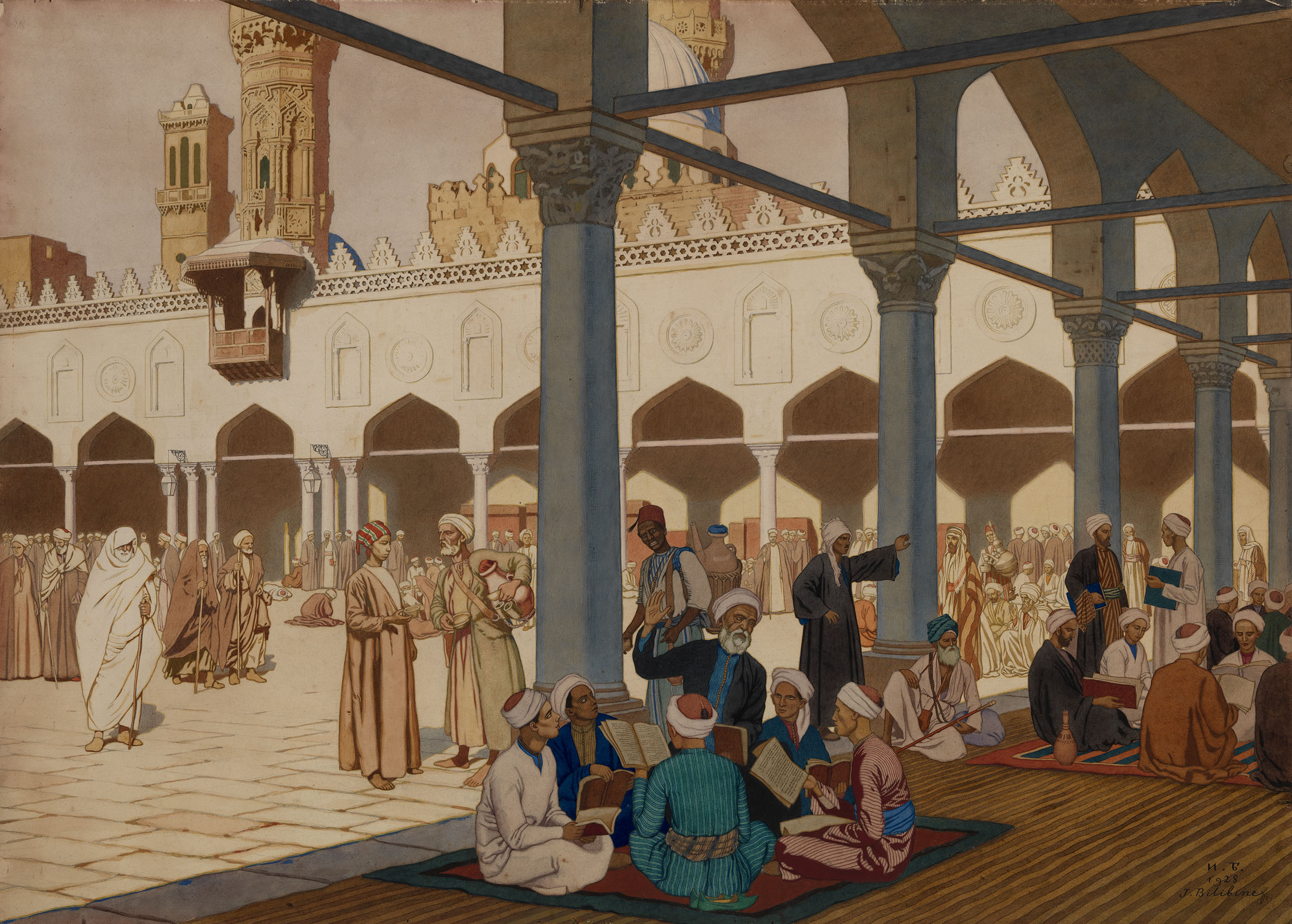
Hezzabine reading the Hizb Rateb

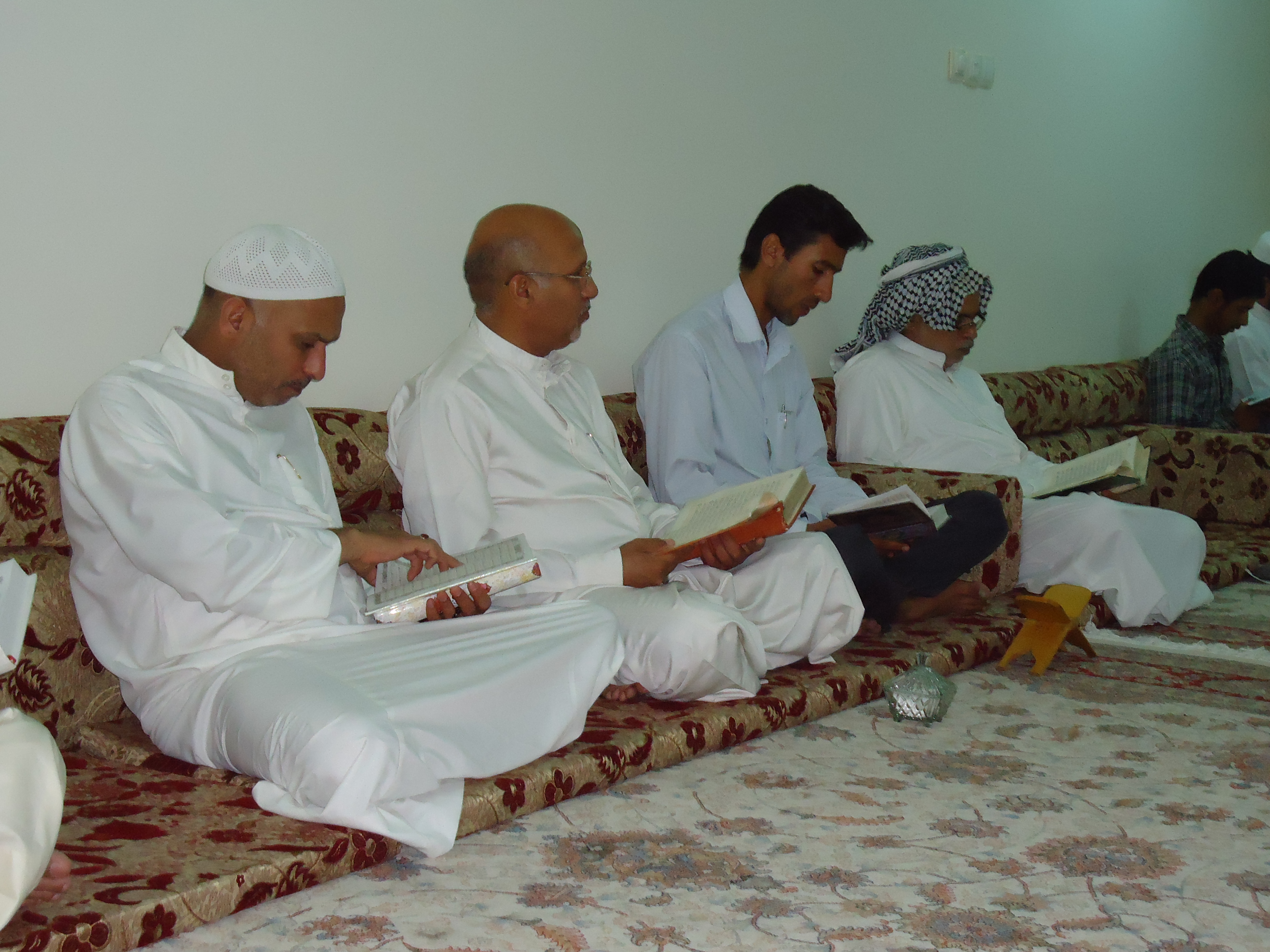
Hezzabine reading the Hizb Rateb

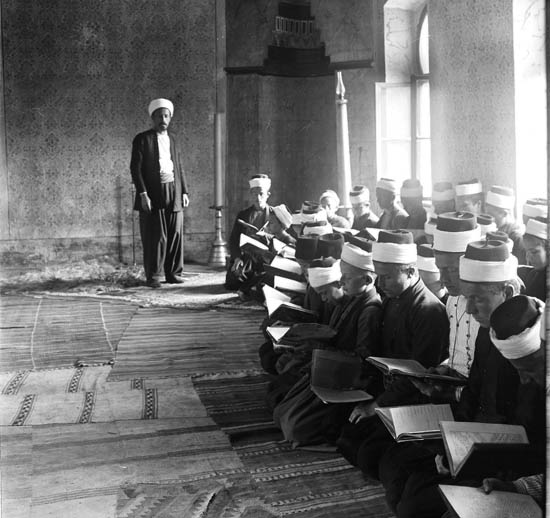
Hezzabine reading the Hizb Rateb

== See also ==
- Ministry of Religious Affairs and Endowments
- Algerian islamic reference
- Islam in Algeria
- Religion in Algeria
- Muftis in Algiers
- Zawiyas in Algeria
- List of mosques in Algeria
- Djamaa el Djazaïr
- Djamaa el Kebir
- Warsh recitation
- Idjaza
- Hizb Rateb
- Hezzab
- Bash Hezzab
- Salka
- Raising hands in Dua
- Tawassul
- Tilawa
- Sujud Tilawa
