= Bash Hezzab =

Senior reciter of Qur'an in Algerian mosques

The Bash Hezzab (Arabic: بَاشْ حَزَّاب) is the senior Hezzab supervising the Hizb Rateb and Salka in mosques and zawiyas in Algeria according to the Algerian Islamic reference under the supervision of the Ministry of Religious Affairs and Endowments.

== History ==
The mosques in Algeria contain many Hezzabine supervised by the Bash Hezzab along with other employees who take care of these buildings of Muslim ibadah.

Historically, the Djamaâ Sidi Ramdane in the Casbah of Algiers housed one Bash Hezzab which supervised five Hezzabine.

The mosque of Djamaa el Kebir was served by the mufti of Algiers, assisted by two Imams, under their authority are placed a Moudaris, explicator of the Quran, a Bash Hezzab, head of the readers, six Hezzabine of first class, and twelve Hezzabine of second class.

== Characteristics ==
The Bash Hezzab should be a senior hafiz of the Quran as a whole, with the narration of Warsh recitation.

As for the Hezzab, the condition of memorizing the entire Quran is due to the fact that it is not suitable and acceptable for him to read from the Mus'haf while he leads the Hezzabine and the group of readers (Arabic: ناس الحضور) and directs them at the same time.

It is obligatory for him to obtain a Quran Idjaza from an accredited body such as a zawiya or an Islamic institute to prove his merit for the position and religious responsibility, and he must possess a strong vocal layer that allows him to dominate the voice over the entirety of the qāriʾs during the Hizb Rateb recitation.

== Functions ==
During the Tilawa of the Hizb Rateb, according to Warsh recitation, the different Hezzabine, or readers of the Quranic Hizb, are placed under the authority of the chief reader, the Bash Hezzab, while the ordinary Talibes may attend or be content to read books of precepts, and finally the muezzins call the faithful to the Salah with the Adhan.

Indeed, the Bash Hezzab in addition to chairing the Halqa (Arabic: حَلْقَة) of the Hizb Rateb on a daily basis and ensuring the presence and attendance of the Hezzabine, he welcomes among others the Nass al-Houdhour (Arabic: نَاسُ الْحُضُورِ) who want to listen to the collective recitation or participate through the Quran that they memorize or read on the Mus'hafs.

He works on the reading of Sahih Bukhari throughout the holy month of Rajab in concert with the Hezzabine and Nass al-Houdhour.

In addition to ensuring the proper conduct of the Hizb Rateb and the recitation of the Sahih Bukhari, the Bash Hezzab organizes the reading of educational books of Maliki Madhhab such as Muwatta Imam Malik, Matn Ibn Ashir, Qatr an-Nada and the Risala fiqhiya among others.

When the Salka is organized in a mosque or a zawiya, the Bash Hezzab, through his religious and hierarchical skills, assists the Imam or the Sheikh in the course of this recitation of the entirety of the sixty Hizbs of the Quran in a single day or overnight, whether the Salka is thus diurnal or nocturnal.

== Gallery ==
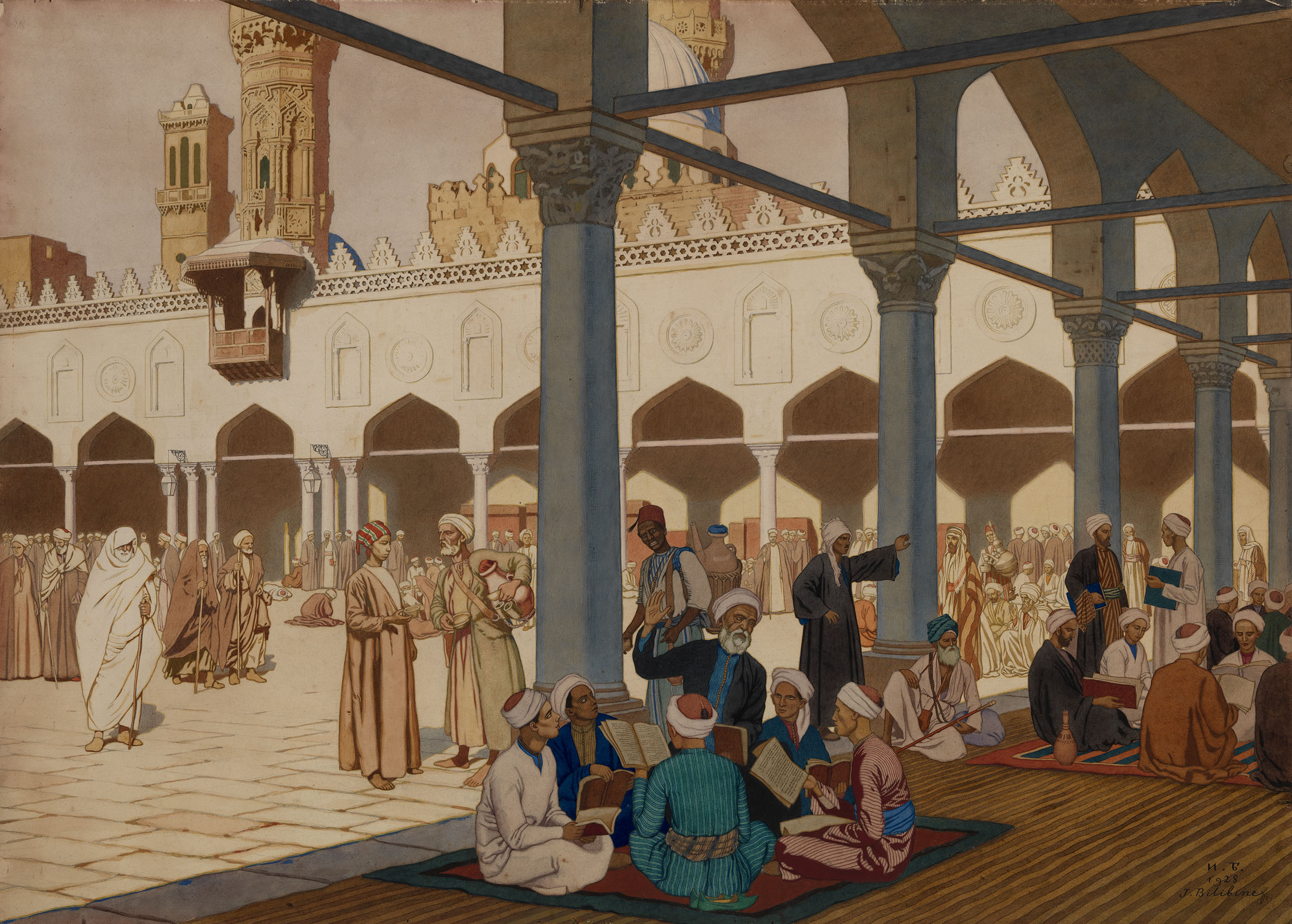
Hezzabine reading the Hizb Rateb

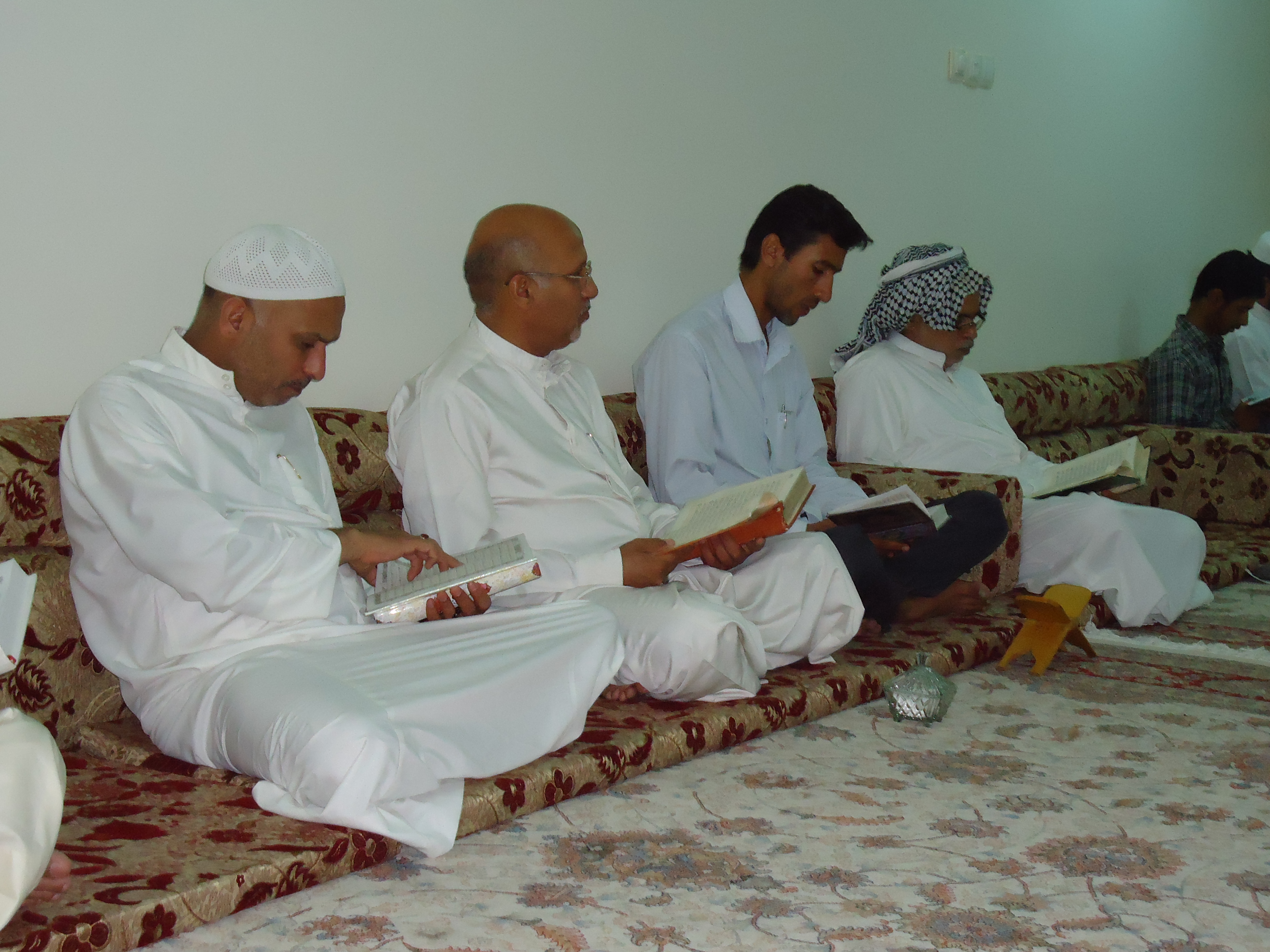
Hezzabine reading the Hizb Rateb

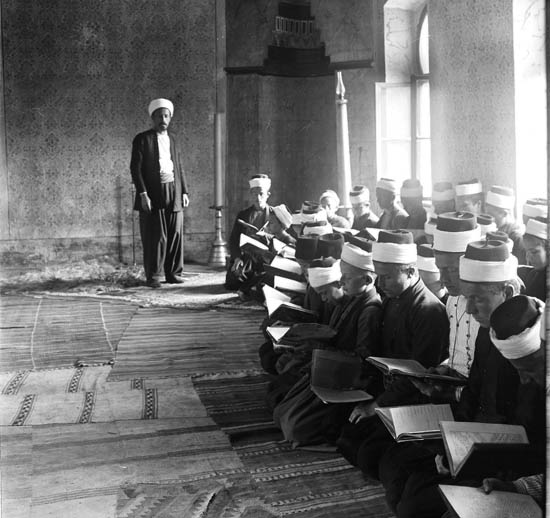
Hezzabine reading the Hizb Rateb

== See also ==
- Ministry of Religious Affairs and Endowments
- Algerian Islamic reference
- Islam in Algeria
- Religion in Algeria
- Muftis in Algiers
- Zawiyas in Algeria
- List of mosques in Algeria
- Djamaa el Djazaïr
- Djamaa el Kebir
- Warsh recitation
- Idjaza
- Hizb Rateb
- Hezzab
- Nass al-Houdhour
- Salka
- Raising hands in Dua
- Tawassul
- Tilawa
- Sujud Tilawa
