= Hezzab =

Reciter of Qur'an in Algerian mosques

The Hezzab (Arabic: حَزَّاب) is the hafiz or qāriʾ supervising or participating in the Hizb Rateb in mosques and zawiyas in Algeria according to the Algerian Islamic reference under the supervision of the Ministry of Religious Affairs and Endowments.

== History ==
Mosques in Algeria recruit several hezzabine as salaried employees responsible for reciting the Hizb Rateb on a daily basis, as well as the Salka periodically, under the supervision of a Bash Hezzab.

As an example, the Mosque of Sidi Abderrahmane Et-Thaalibi had its employees such as Wakil, Imam and Hezzab among others.

== Characteristics ==
The hezzab should be a hafiz of the Quran as a whole, with the narration of Warsh recitation.

When accomplishing the Tilawa, the condition of memorizing the entire Quran is because it is not suitable and acceptable for him to read from the Mus'haf while he leads the group of readers (Arabic: ناس الحضور) and directs them at the same time.

It is good for him to obtain a Quran Idjaza from an accredited body such as a zawiya or an Islamic institute to prove his merit for the position and religious responsibility.

And he must possess a strong vocal layer that allows him to dominate the voice over the entirety of the qāriʾs during the Hizb Rateb recitation.

This is because the reading stations of the hezzab make its circle attractive, and dozens or even hundreds of worshipers visit the mosque for the daily participation in this collective recitation.

According to the degree of skill, discipline, attractiveness of voice and performance, the hezzab can rise to the rank of Bash Hezzab in the large mosques that contain many hezzabine.

After that, he can be promoted to the rank of a muezzin and then imam, as was done in the past in the Algerian mosques and zawiyas.

== Gallery ==
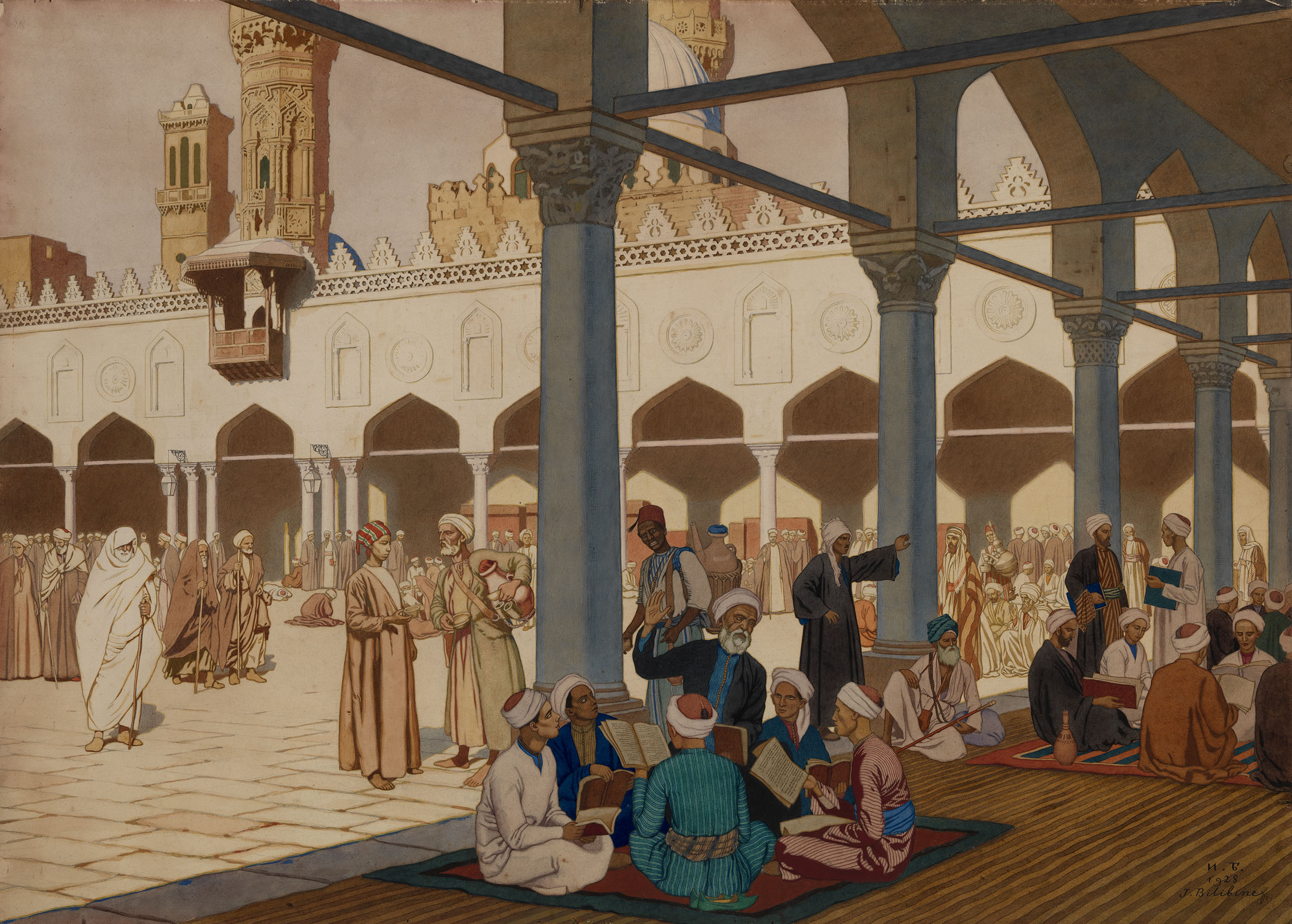
Hezzabine reading the Hizb Rateb

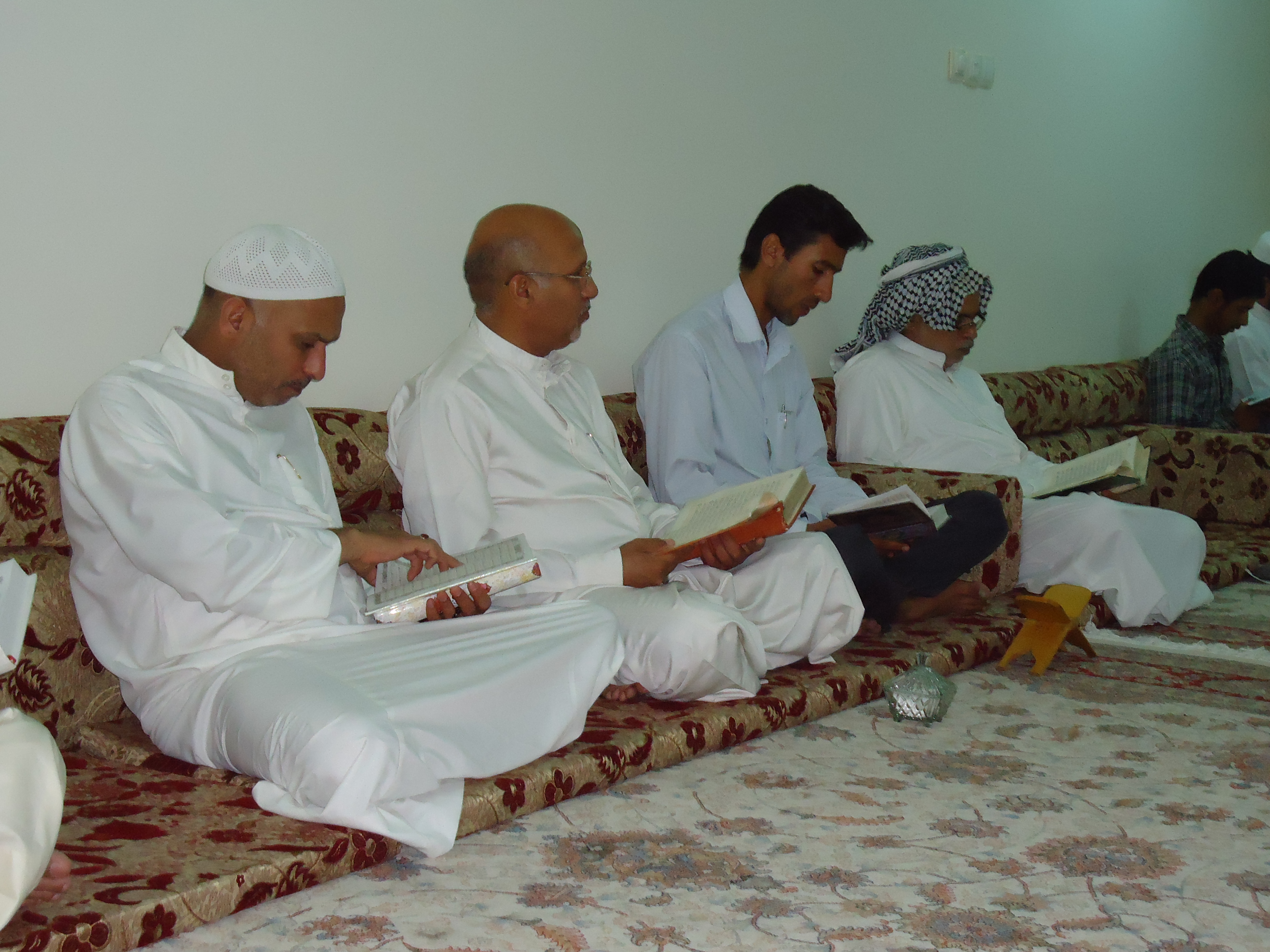
Hezzabine reading the Hizb Rateb

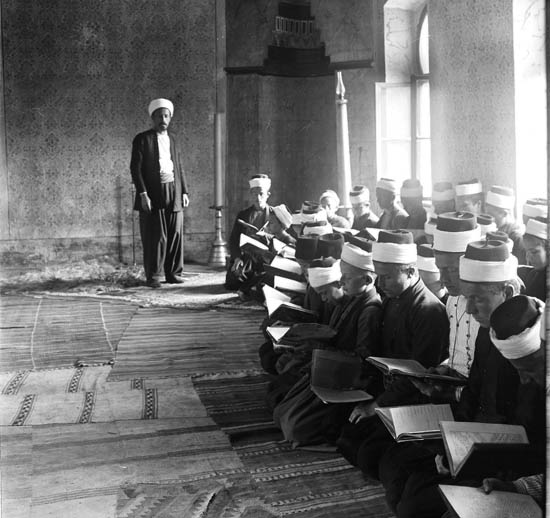
Hezzabine reading the Hizb Rateb

== See also ==
- Ministry of Religious Affairs and Endowments
- Algerian islamic reference
- Islam in Algeria
- Religion in Algeria
- Muftis in Algiers
- Zawiyas in Algeria
- List of mosques in Algeria
- Djamaa el Djazaïr
- Djamaa el Kebir
- Warsh recitation
- Idjaza
- Hizb Rateb
- Nass al-Houdhour
- Bash Hezzab
- Salka
- Raising hands in Dua
- Tawassul
- Tilawa
- Sujud Tilawa
