= Zawiyas in Algeria =

Wikimedia article list

The zawiyas in Algeria are religious buildings located in Algeria honoring the memory of patron saints and dedicated to Quranic and religious education. Each zawiya (zaouïa) is affiliated with an Algerian Sufi tariqa (torouq) brotherhood under the supervision of the Ministry of Religious Affairs and Endowments, in accordance with the precepts of the Algerian Islamic reference.

== History ==
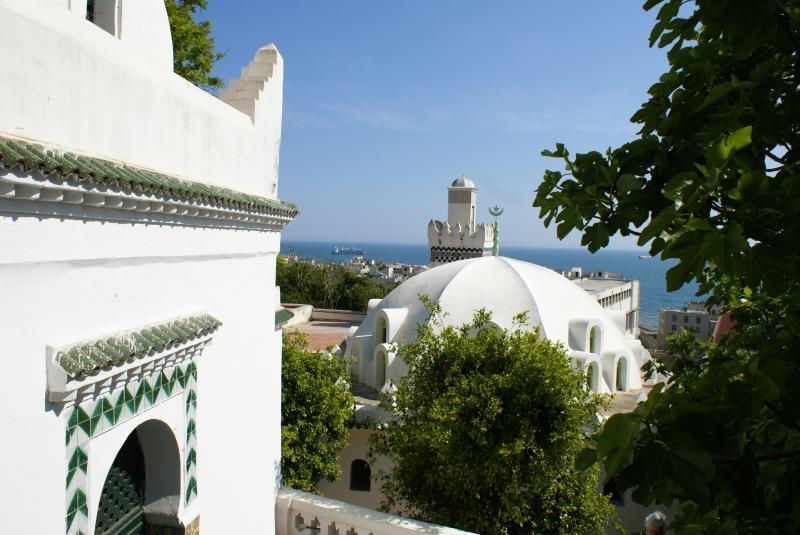
Zawiya Thaalibia

The history of the zawiyas in Algeria is linked to that of the Sufi brotherhoods or tourouqs. With the advent of the fifteenth century, the movement to create these spiritual retreats intensified, as the Muslim world in the Machrek as in the Maghreb declined.

The large Muslim cities lost their scientific and spiritual influence when the last Muslim dynasties lost educational and initiatory control over the mass of Muslim faithful due to the fragmentation of territories between rival emirates. The territory of what is now Algeria was thus torn between two Berber Muslim dynasties that were the Zianid kingdom of Tlemcen to the west and the Hafsid dynasty of Tunis to the east.

Religious education in the Maghreb was then concentrated in Fez in the Al Quaraouiyine mosque, and in the Great Mosque of Kairouan. As for the central part bordering the two dynasties Zianide and Hafside, it saw its great intellectual centers in Cherchell and Béjaïa being reduced to their simplest formal expression.

To save Quranic teaching in this conflicting central Maghreb, which later became Algeria, the village customary authorities took charge of safeguarding the Muslim cult by erecting zawiyas in each confederation of tribes.

Scholarly students were selected at the end of the fourteenth century and the beginning of the fifteenth century, after preliminary local Quranic studies, they were then sent to the Al-Azhar mosque in Egypt, passing either through Fez or Kairouan, to perfect their skills and doctrinal training. The return of these hundreds of Maghrebian theologians after a journey of several years of study in the Machrek, and their installation in the Eastern Zianid and Western Hafsid villages, allowed the creation of the Zawiyas which perpetuated the Muslim influence despite the civilizational decline that then fell on the south of the Mediterranean basin.

The advent of the reconquista and the massive exodus of Andalusian Moors, towards the coast and the coastal urban centers of the Maghreb, brought with them a version of the Muslim mystic inherited from Ibn Arabi and Abdul Qadir Gilani which became embedded in the landscape of Maghrebian Sufism. This is how the Qadiriyya tariqa spread across the central Maghreb and saw the emergence of notable theologians and ascetics like Sidi Abd al-Rahman al-Tha'alibi who had his Zawiya Thaalibia built next to Thaalibi Mosque in the Casbah of Algiers.

== Quran recitation ==
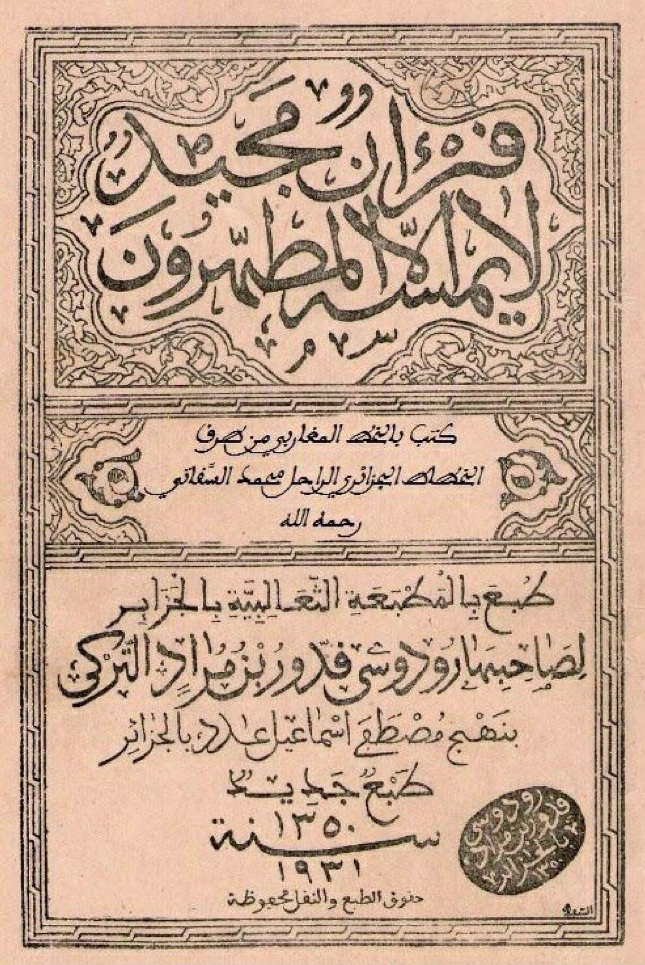
Thaalibia Quran

The Quran is the main subject taught in each zawiya in Algeria where the reading of the Quran is done according to the canonical method of Warsh recitation, by way of Al-Azraq and Al-Isfahani (died 908 CE), which is assumed in this religious institution.

Before the advent of modern mechanized printing, Algerian zawiyas relied on manuscripts of the Quran for the reading and recitation of verses and suras, but the founding of the Thaalibia Publishing in 1895 for the first time made it possible to produce the Thaalibia Quran written with the Maghrebi script, and this Mus'haf was used until 1979 as the official Mus'haf of the zawiyas in particular and of the Algerians in general.

The burgeoning popularity of the Kufic script for transcribing the Arabic language into Algerian textbooks forced zawiyas and mosques to produce a printed version of the Quran in 1979 named the Algeria Quran according to this Kufic script.

== Teachings ==
Several Islamic sciences are taught in the Algerian zawiyas, as the Hadith which is taught on the basis of Al-Muwatta compiled by Imam Malik ibn Anas. This is how the fiqh according to the Malikite Madhhab is observed in the courts of each zawiya which is based on the body of the Mukhtasar Khalil written by Khalil ibn Ishaq al-Jundi.

Another reference of the Malikite fiqh dispensed in this zawiya is the Risala fiqhiya written by Ibn Abi Zayd al-Qayrawani. A third Malikite fiqh reference inculcated in this zawiya is Matn Ibn Ashir written by Abdul Wahid Ibn Ashir.

The Arabic language is taught on the basis of the text of the Al-Alfiyya of Ibn Malik composed by Ibn Malik. The syntax of the Arabic language is taught on the basis of the text of the Al-Ajurrumiyya composed by Ibn Adjurrum. The teaching of this same syntax is based on the text of Qatr al-Nada composed by Ibn Hisham al-Ansari.

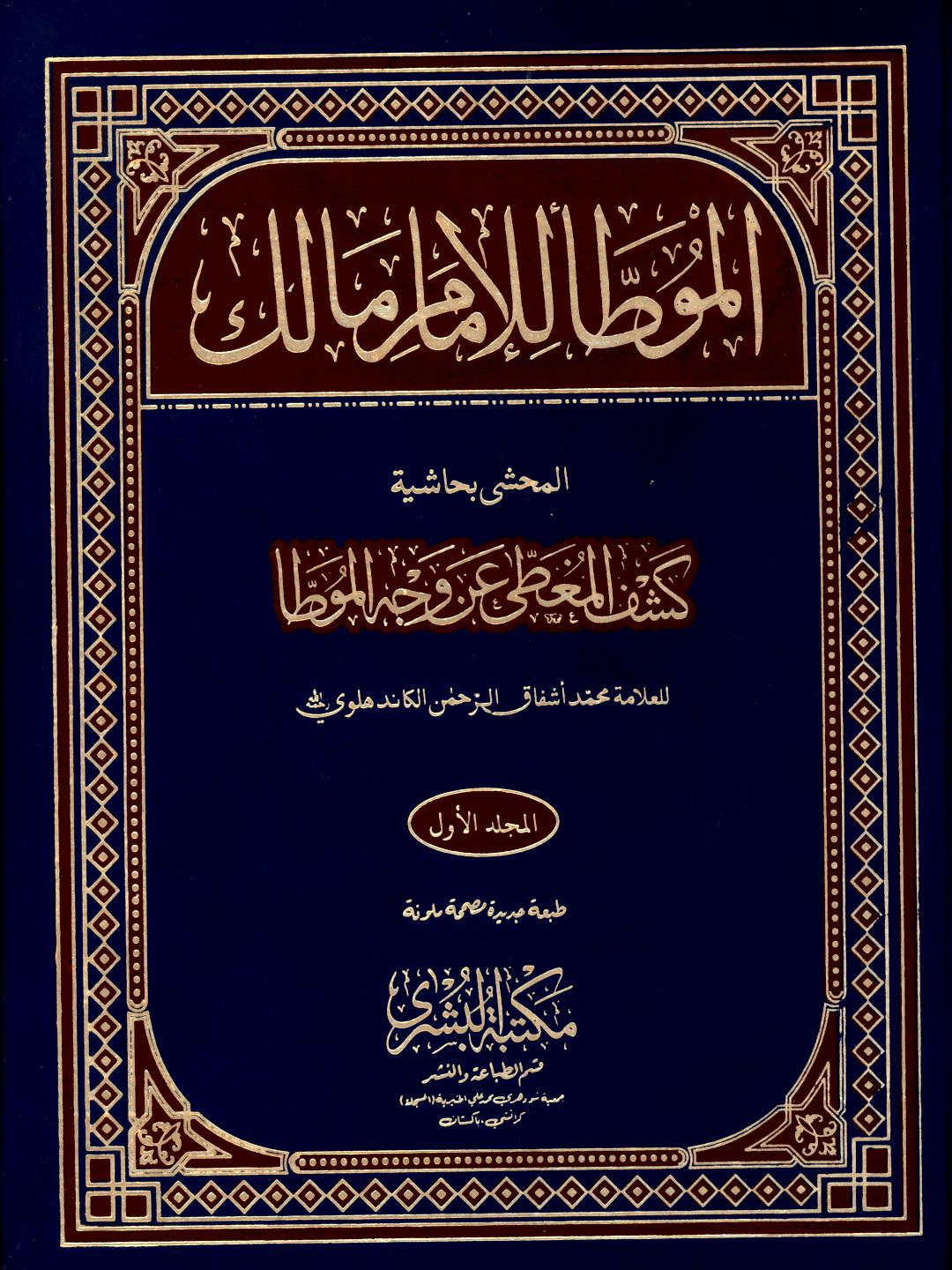
Muwatta Imam Malik

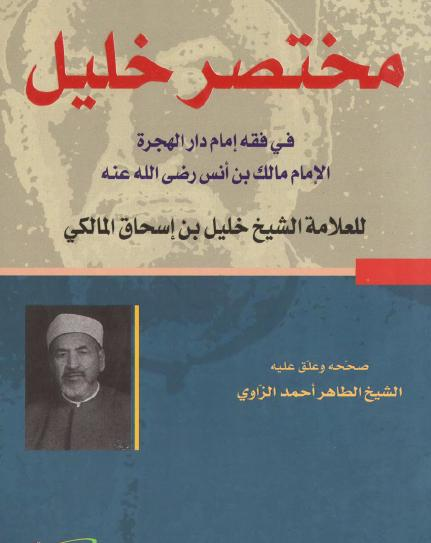
Mukhtasar Khalil

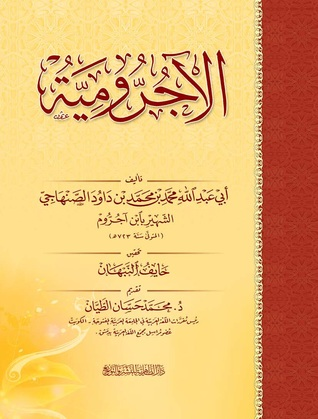
Al-Ajurrumiyya

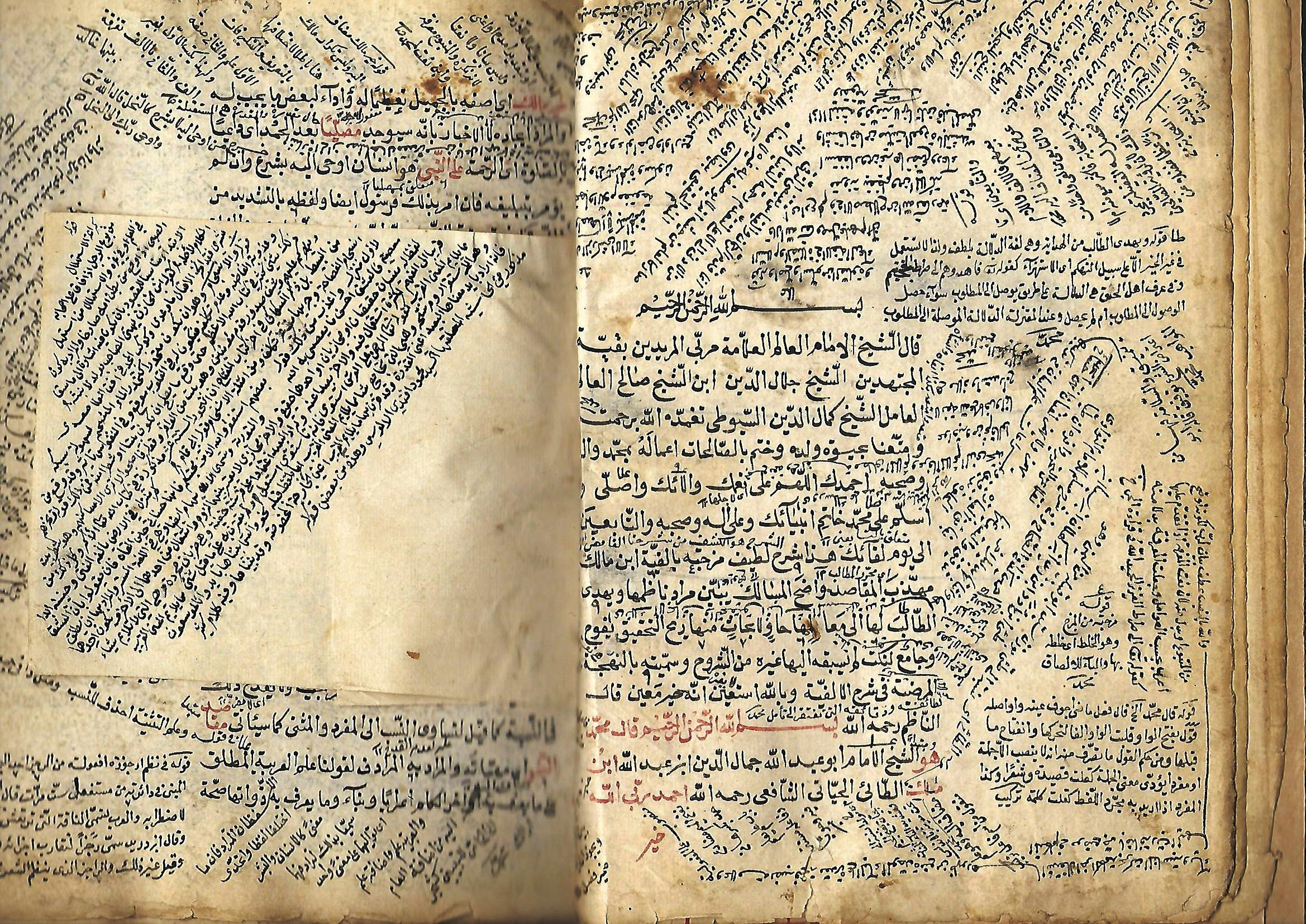
Al-Alfiyya of Ibn Malik

== Idjazates ==
The talibe (scholar) receives from the zawiya a certificate called Idjaza at the end of each level of his teaching to certify his pedagogical success. This Idjaza, in addition to qualifying the talibe for professional employment in religious education or affairs as mudaris, muezzin, or imam, allows him to be included in the Sanad of the Silsila of the Shuyukhs of his Sufi tariqa.

== Ceremonies ==
The zawiyas, as popular religious institutions, participate in social life through activities combining the spiritual with the festive. Thus the daily and periodic collective recitation of the Quran such as the Hizb Rateb and the Salka is at the center of the activity of each zawiya.

The ceremonies linked to the Mawlid and to the memory of the ancient Sufis in the Haḍra and the Ziyarat are also part of the social activities of these Quranic schools. Other social festivals with religious connotations see the participation of the zawiyas in their organization and joviality such as the Ashura, the Sebiba, the Tweeza, the Wezeea and the Mawsim.

== Tariqas ==
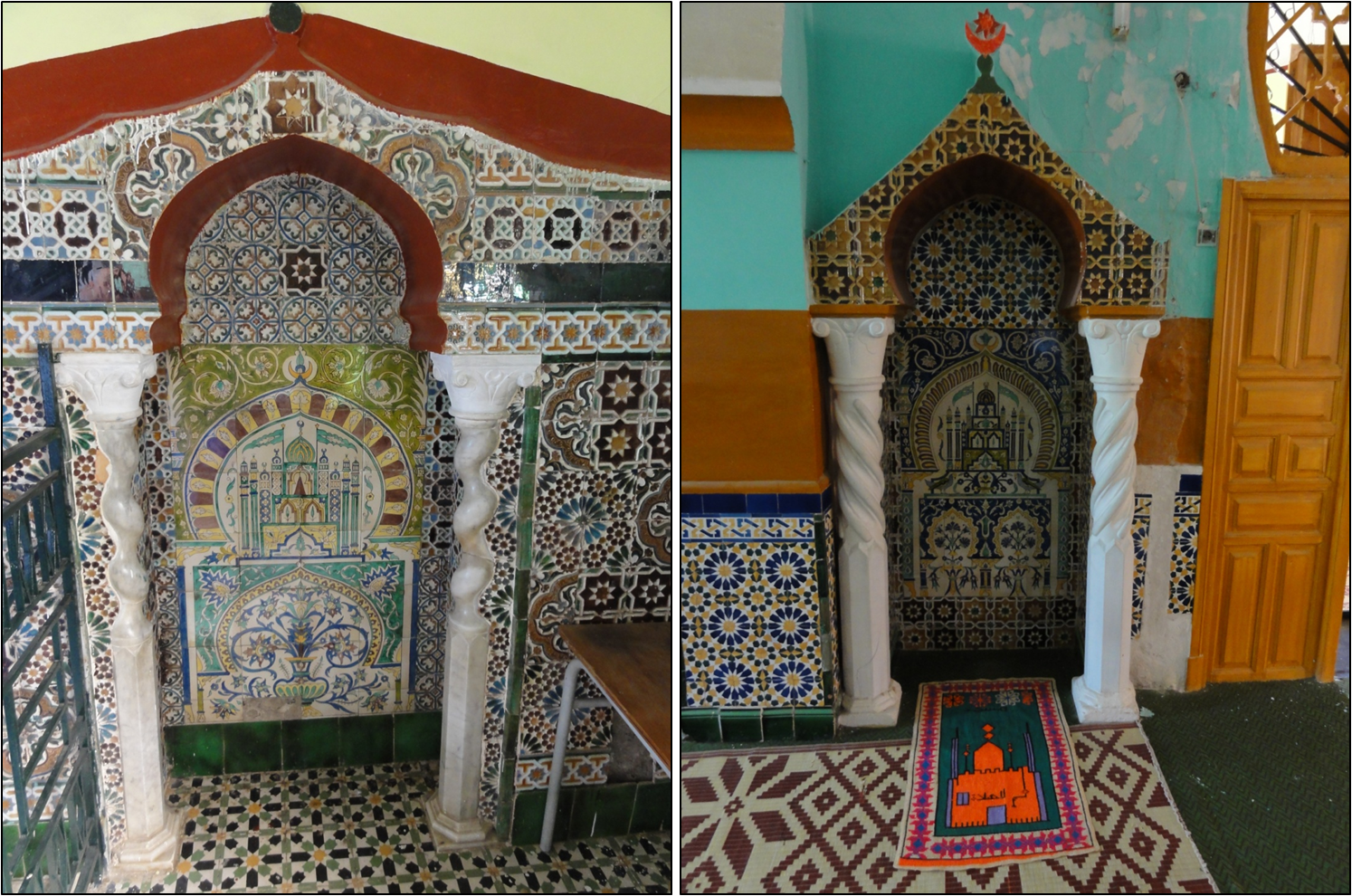
Zawiya of Sidi M'hamed Bou Qobrine in Bounouh.

Each of the Algerian zawiyas is affiliated to a Sufi tariqa. Among the affiliated tariqa are:`

- Alawiyya
- Chabiyya
- Darqawiyya
- Dardouriyya
- Habibiyya
- Hansaliyya
- Isawiyya
- Karzaziyya
- Khalwatiyya
- Madyaniyya
- Nasiriyya
- Omariyya
- Ouazzaniyya
- Qadiriyya
- Rahmaniyya
- Senusiyya
- Shadhiliyya
- Sheikhiyya
- Taïbiyya
- Tijaniyya
- Youssoufiyya
- Zaïaniyya
- Zarrouqiyya

== Zawiyas ==
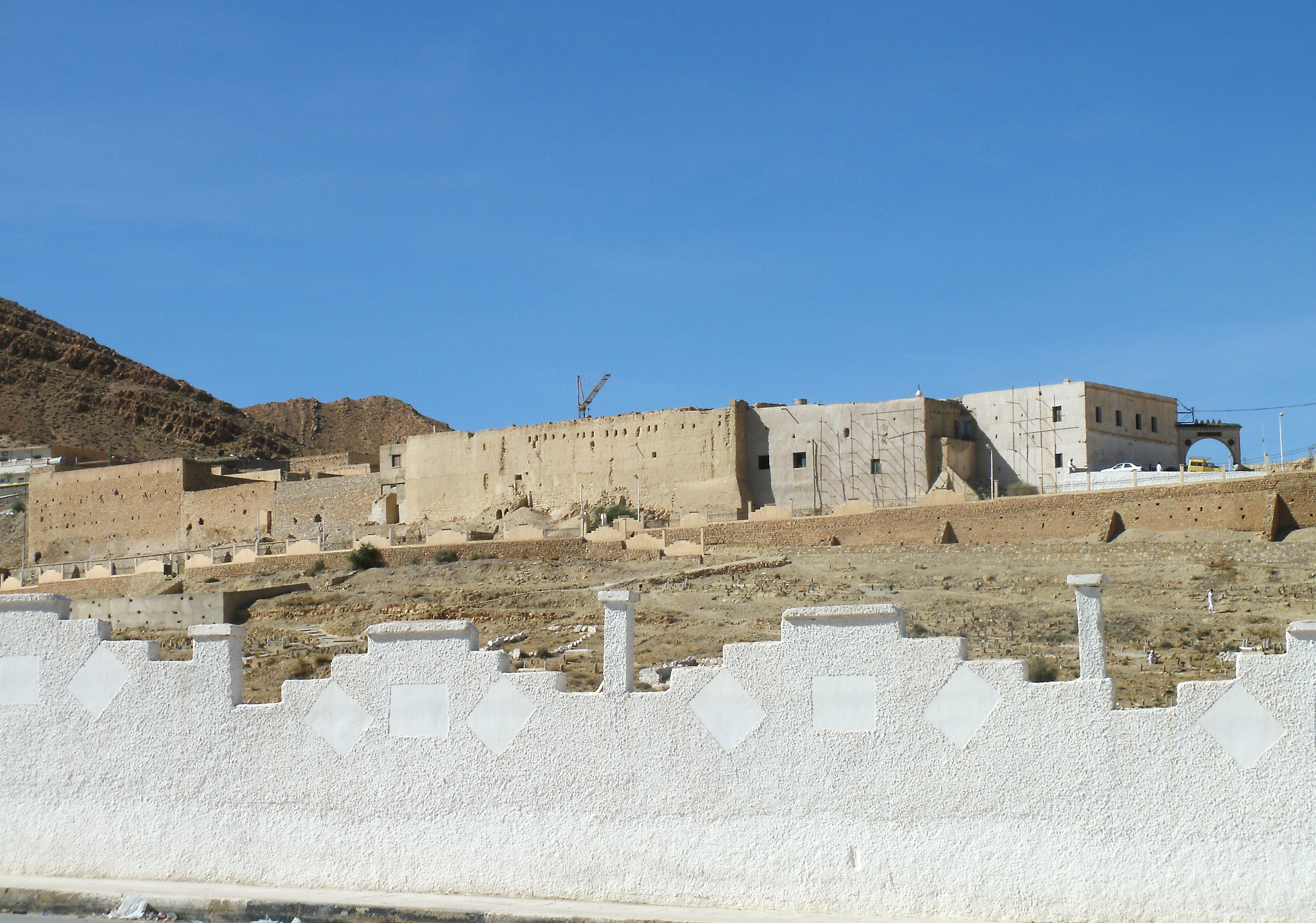
Zawiya of El Hamel in El Hamel.

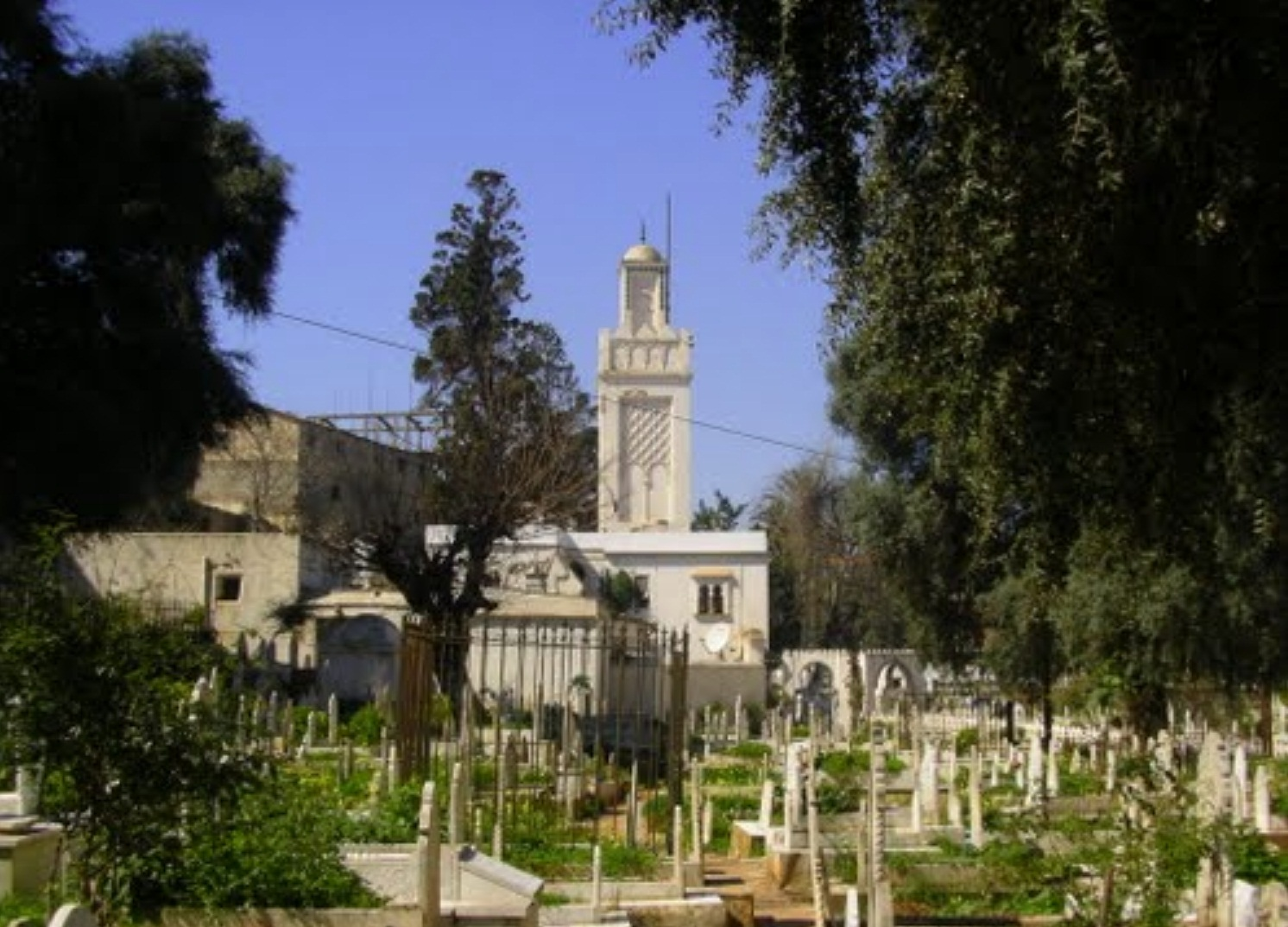
Zawiya of Sidi M'hamed Bou Qobrine in Belouizdad, Algiers

More than 1,600 zawiyas were existing in Algeria before its independence in 1962, among them:

- Zawiyet Sidi M'Hamed Saadi in Aafir
- Zawiyet Sidi Ali Debbaghi in Beni Amrane
- Zawiyet Sidi M'hamed Bou Qobrine in Bounouh
- Zawiyet Sidi Salem in Boudouaou
- Zawiyet El Hamel in El Hamel
- Zawiya Thaalibia in the Issers
- Zawiyet Sidi Ghobrini in Khemis El-Khechna
- Zawiya Belkaïdia in Oran
- Zawiyet Sidi Amar Cherif in Sidi Daoud
- Zawiyet Sidi Boumerdassi in Tidjelabine
- Zawiyet Sidi Boushaki in Thenia

=== In Algiers ===
Some of the zawiya in the city of Algiers are:

- Zawiya Thaalibia
- Zawiyet Sidi M'hamed Bou Qobrine
- Zawiyet Sidi Saadi
- Zawiyet Sidi Amar
- Zawiya Belkaïdia

== See also ==
- Idjaza
- Hezzab
- Bash Hezzab
