= Algerian Islamic reference =

The Algerian Islamic reference is the legal framework for the practice of the religion of Islam in Algeria within Sunnism under the tutelage of the Ministry of Religious Affairs and Endowments.

== Reference elements ==
=== Sunnism ===
Algeria belongs to the Sunni world, the largest branch of Islam, and is part of the Islamic community to which the vast majority of Muslims belong.

The sources of its Sunni Islamic jurisprudence are the Quran and Sunnah of Muhammad in the hadiths attributed to him.

==== Ash'arism ====
Algeria is based in its Muslim aqidah on Ash'arism which is a theological school of Islam, founded by Al-Ash'ari (873-935).

==== Malikism ====
Algeria adopts Malikism, which is one of the four Madhhabs of Sunni Muslim law, based on the teaching of Imam Malik ibn Anas (711-795).

==== Sufism ====
Sufism is taught and practiced in more than 1,600 zawiyas in Algeria.

==== Quranic recitation ====
The Tilawa of the Quran in Algerian mosques takes place according to Warsh recitation in the Salah, the Hizb Rateb and the Salka.

== See also ==
- Djamaa el Djazaïr
- Djamaa el Kebir
- Idjaza
- Hezzab
- Tawassul
