= Algeria Quran =

Quranic manuscript

- Original title: مصحف الجزائر
- Illustrator: Mohamed Cherifi
- Language: Arabic
- Genre: Quranic Mus'haf
- Publisher: SNED, ENAG
- Publication date: 1979
- Publication place: Algeria
- Pages: 607 (first edition)

The Algeria Quran is a Quranic manuscript (mus'haf) written in Algeria with the Naskh script, written according to the Warsh recitation in 1977 by Mohamed Cherifi.

To date, the print copy has seen three editions, the first published by the SNED, (formerly Hachette Algeria), in 1979. The Second edition (1984) was published by ENAG and the third by the EPA in 2010.

== See also ==
- Islam in Algeria
- Ten recitations
