= Hizb (disambiguation) =

A Hizb is a part of the Quran.

Hizb or Hezb may also refer to:

- Hizb Rateb, a collective recitation in Sufism
- Rub el Hizb, an Islamic symbol
- Hizbul Mujahideen, an Islamist militant group in Kashmir
