= Abu Bakr al-Isfahani =

Persian imam

Imam Abu Bakr al-Isfahani Qari in Warsh recitation
- أبو بكر محمد بن عبد الرحيم بن إبراهيم بن شبيب بن يزيد بن خالد بن قرة بن خالد بن قرة بن عبد الله الأسدي الإصفهاني

Personal life
- Born: Isfahan
- Died: 908 CE / 296 AH Baghdad
- Era: Abbasid era
- Education: Qiraat, Hadith studies
- Known for: Warsh recitation

Religious life
- Religion: Islam
- School: Sunni

Abu Bakr al-Isfahani (born in Isfahan – died 908 CE in Baghdad), popularly known as Al-Isfahani (Arabic: الإصفهاني; from Isfahan), was a Persian Quran reciter who specialized in Warsh recitation.

== Biography ==
Al-Isfahani was an imam in Warsh recitation.

He studied Warsh recitation in Cairo in Egypt, where he read to Warsh students.

Then he settled in Baghdad, where he was the first Quran Qari to introduce Warsh recitation to Iraq.

== Teachers ==
Al-Isfahani learned Warsh recitation from many of Imam Warsh's students in Cairo, including:

- Abu al-Rabie al-Rashedini (Arabic: أبو الربيع الرشديني المهري المصري).
- Abu al-Achaath al-Jarashi (Arabic: أبو الأشعث الجرشي المصيصي المصري).
- Abu al-Qasim al-Muafiri (Arabic: أبو القاسم المعافري المصري).
- Ibn Masud al-Madani (Arabic: ابن مسعود المدني).

He studied with other imams, including:

- Abdullah ibn Omar ibn Aban (Arabic: عبد الله بن عمر بن أبان).
