= Muftis in Algiers =

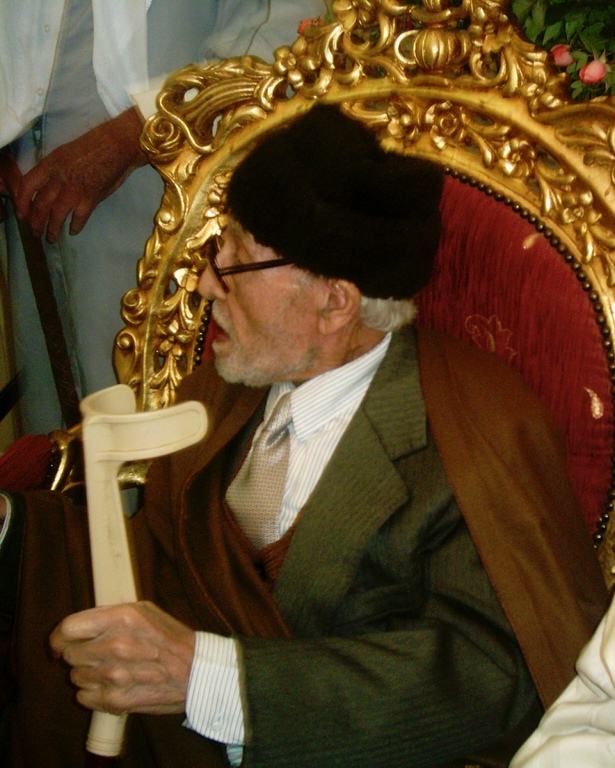
Abderrahmane Djilali

The post of Mufti in Algiers, or Shaykh al-Djazaïr, has been filled by a member of the Maliki and Hanafi ulema, the religious scholars, of Algiers, within the Algerian Islamic reference.

== Maliki muftis ==
Several Maliki Muftis professed in Algiers:

- Abd al-Rahman al-Tha'alibi
- Ahmed Zouaoui
- Sidi M'hamed Bou Qobrine
- Ali ben El-Amine
- Mostafa El Kebabti
- Mostafa Kadiri
- H'mida Ammali
- Ali Ben El-Haffaf
- Belkacem El Hafnaoui
- Mohamed Saïd Benzekri
- Mahmoud Bendali
- Hamoud Hamdane
- Mohamed Baba Ameur
- Ahmed Hammani
- Mohamed Charef
- Abderrahmane Djilali
- Mohamed Tahar Aït Aldjet

== Hanafi muftis ==
Several Hanafi Muftis professed in Algiers:

- Mohamed ben Annabi
- Hamdan Khodja

== See also ==
- Islam in Algeria
- Algerian islamic reference
- Zawiyas in Algeria
- List of Islamic muftiates
- Muftiate
- Mufti
- Grand Mufti
- Imam
