= Raising hands in dua =

Practice in Islamic prayer

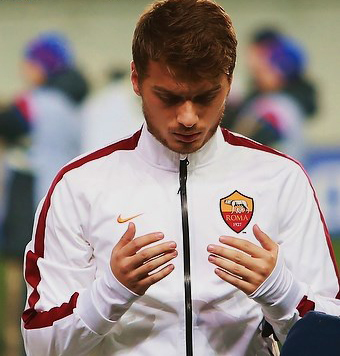
Raising hands in dua

Raising hands in dua (Arabic: رفع اليدين في الدعاء) is the practice of raising hands to invoke Allah in the Islamic prayer dua. This is an optional practice and generally encouraged. Scholars from different schools of thought (madhhab) have a range of views about specific techniques for raising hands and the circumstances in which it is most appropriate to raise hands.

== Views in favor of limitation ==
Many scholars, especially Salafis, limit this practice. According to them, basing on a lack of hadiths for other instances, with a fully authenticated chain, the practice of raising hands is specific to irregular prayers for needs and the qunut of the witr and fajr prayers. This view excludes the practice of regularly raising the hands as sunnah and a mustahabb act of ibadah after fardh salah accompanying a dua. These scholars however do recognize raising hands during a dua not done after salah, saying that the Muslim should raise his hands with humility to Allah in the way instructed by Muhammad.

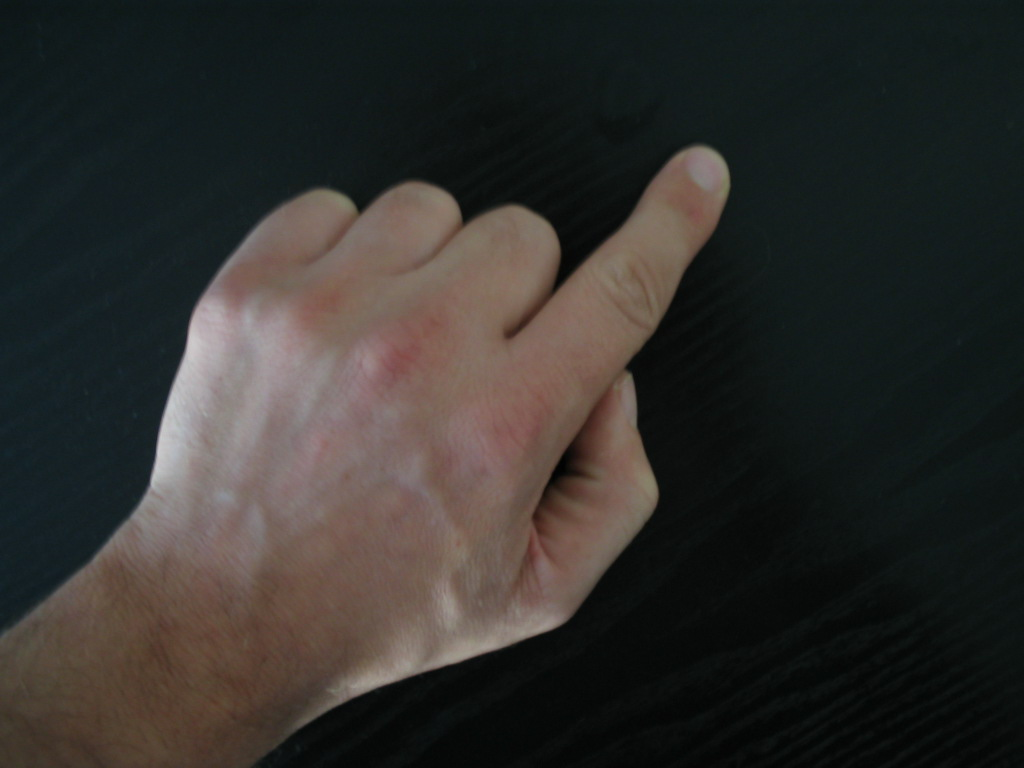
Using one index finger in dua

In some situations, raising the hands in dua may be regarded as a forbidden innovation (bid'ah), such as:

- Salah (except for qunut)
- Khutbah (in specific cases)
- Tawaf
- Sa'iye
- Ruku
- Standing up from Ruku
- Sujud
- Sitting in salah

== Views that encourage raising hands after salah ==
Some scholars, while agreeing with not raising hands in sujud and certain other cases, extend its scope of application. Many such scholars hold the view of praiseworthiness of consistently praying dua after fardh salah with hands raised, as a sunnah action. For example, according to Ahmad ibn Idris al-Fasi there is no room for debate: "there are hadiths transmitted in support of this. One finds in Tirmidhi: 'In the ritual prayer you beg. You are wretched and you are humble, and at the end you raise hands and exclaim "Oh Lord, oh Lord, oh Lord!" Without this the prayer is a miscarriage' And this is manifestly true, being attested by a clear report. In the report they have established what the Messenger, God's blessings and peace be upon him, did and ordered, and what he said about raising one's hands."

== Gallery ==
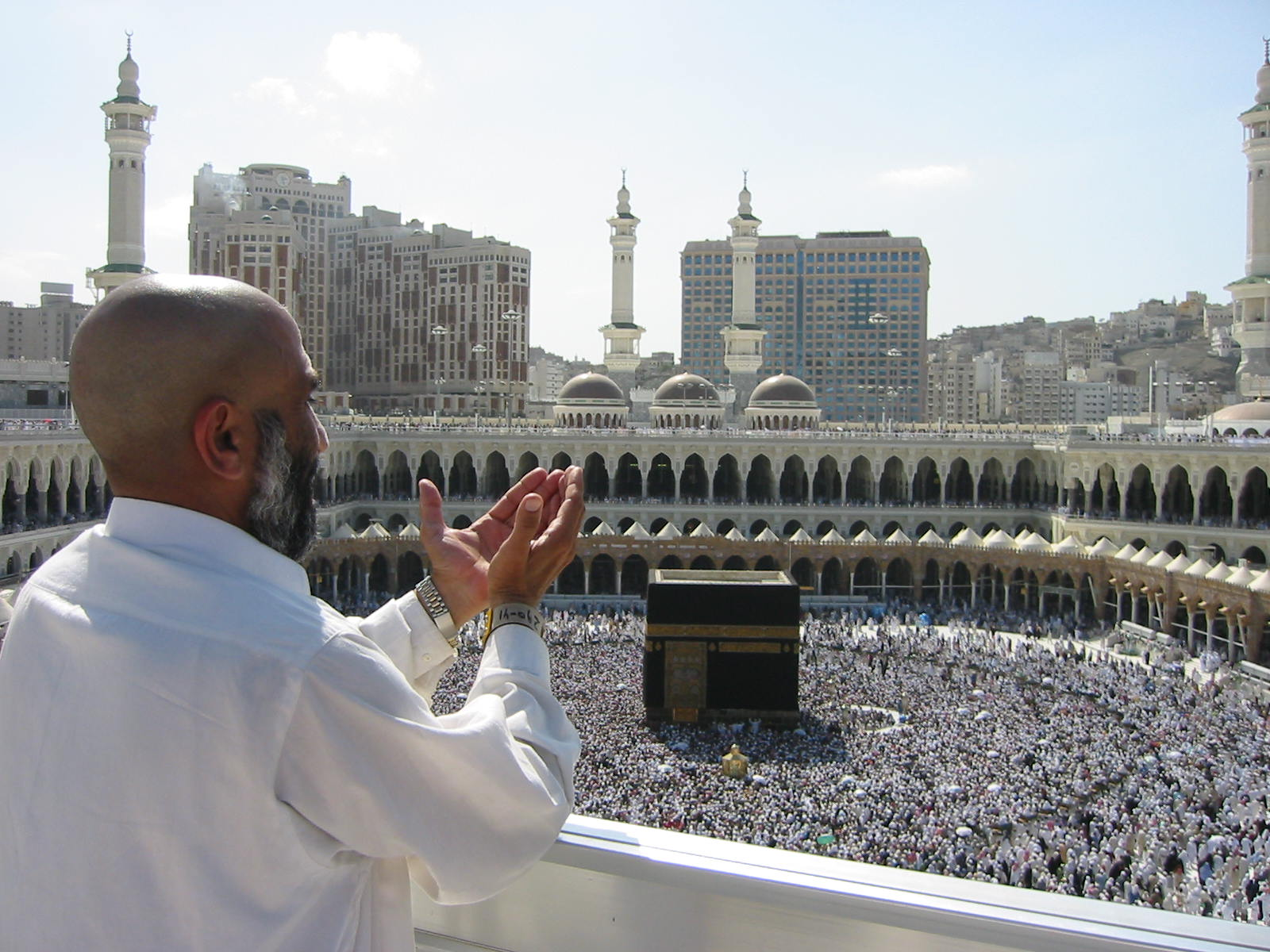
Raising hands

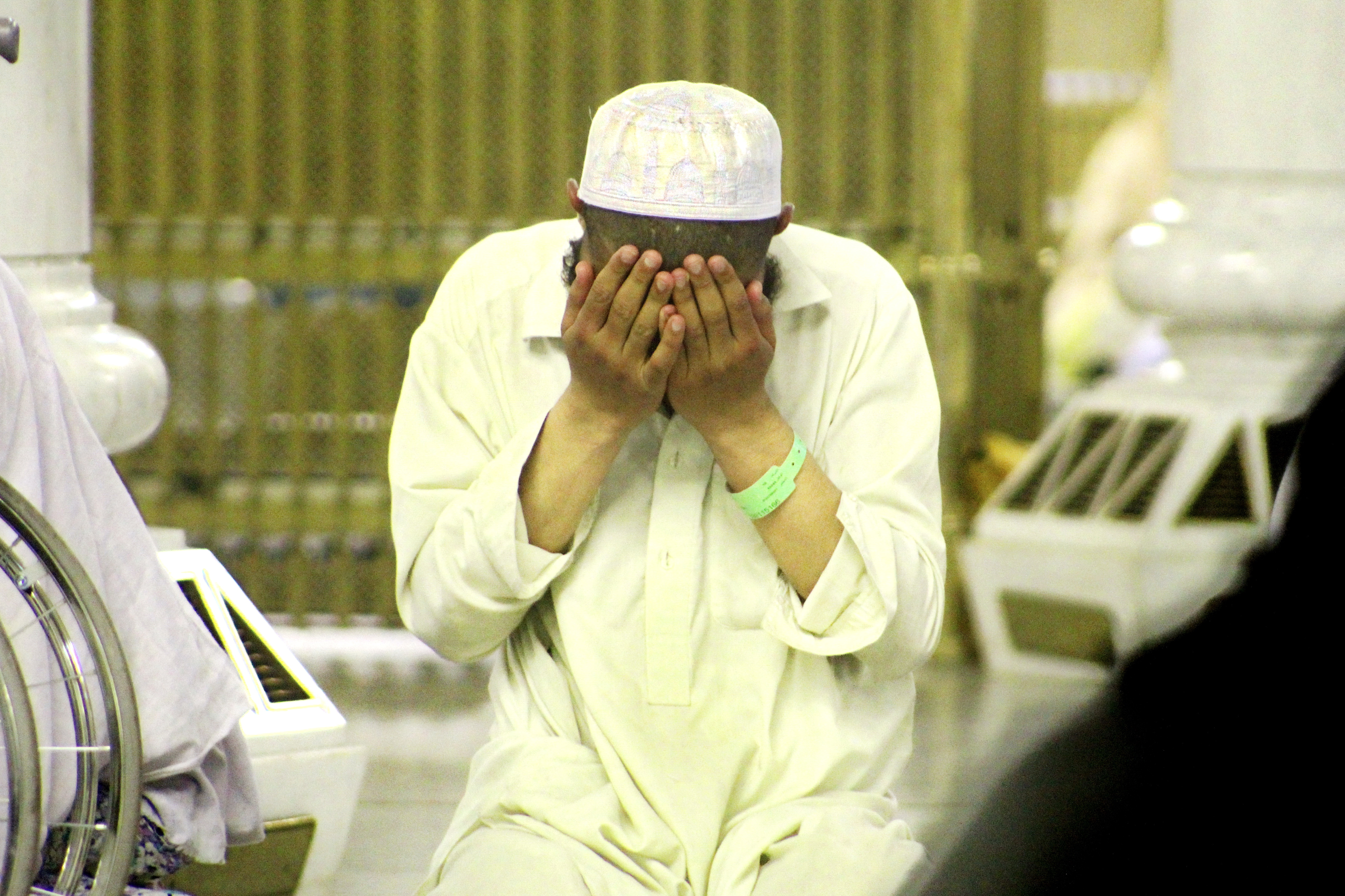
Hands on face

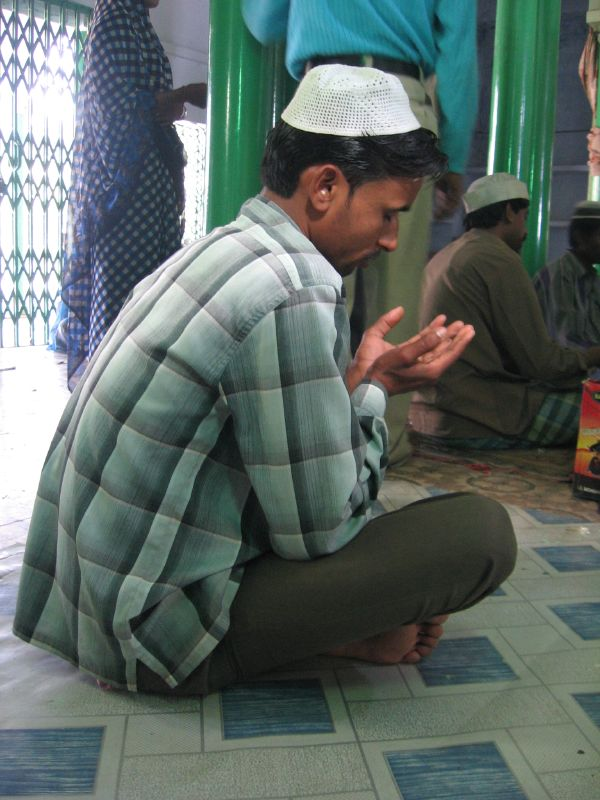
Raising hands

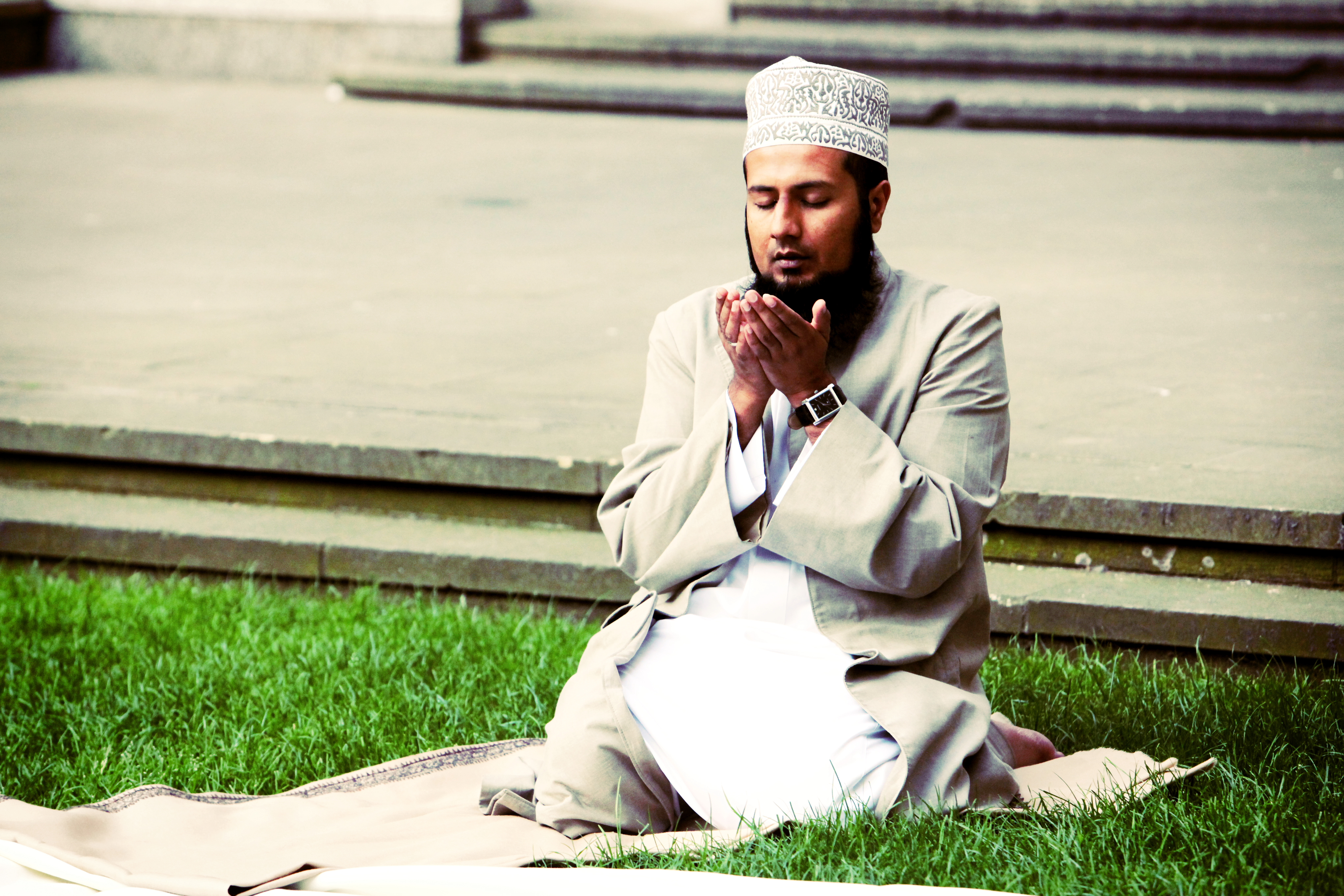
Raising hands

== See also ==
- Dhikr
- Orans
- Wird
