= Djamaa el Kebir =

Historic mosque in Algiers, Algeria

- الجامع الكبير
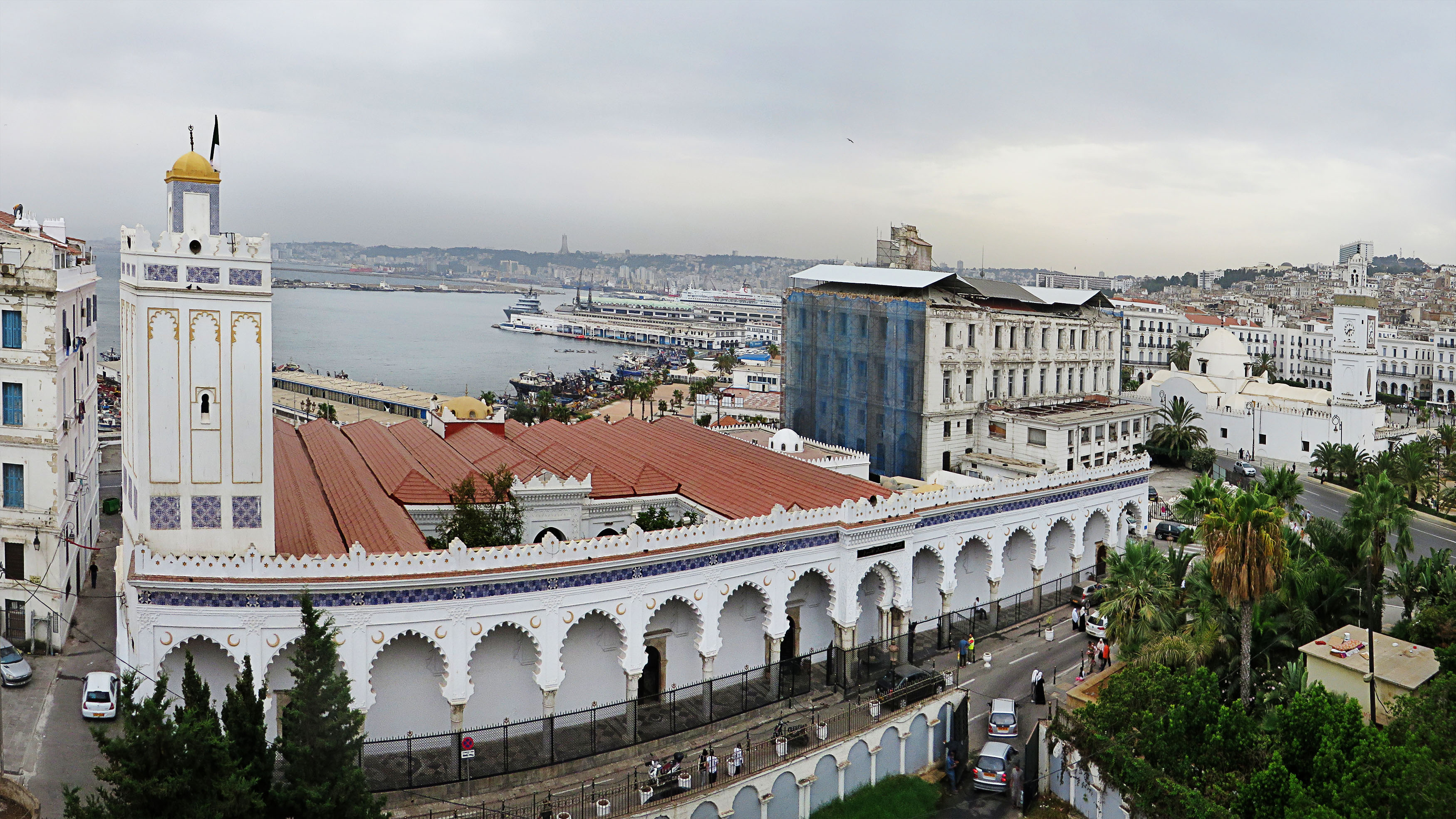

Religion
- Affiliation: Sunni Islam
- Ecclesiastical or organisational status: Mosque
- Status: Active

Location
- Location: Algiers
- Country: Algeria
- Interactive map of Djamaa el Kebir
- Coordinates: 36°47′7″N 3°3′51″E

Architecture
- Style: Moorish (Almoravid)
- Completed: 1097; 1322 (minaret); 1837 (portico)
- Minaret: 1

UNESCO World Heritage Site
- Part of: Casbah of Algiers
- Criteria: Cultural: (ii), (v)
- Reference: 565
- Inscription: 1992 (16th Session)

The Djamaa el Kebir or Great Mosque of Algiers (Arabic: الجامع الكبير, romanized: djama' el-kebir), is a mosque located in the city of Algiers, Algeria. Built in 1097, it is one of the few remaining examples of Almoravid architecture. Although it has undergone other additions and reconstructions since its foundation, it is the oldest mosque in Algiers and is said to be one of the oldest mosques in Algeria after Sidi Okba Mosque and Sidi Ghanem Mosque. The mosque is located in the Casbah of Algiers, a UNESCO World Heritage Site.

== History ==
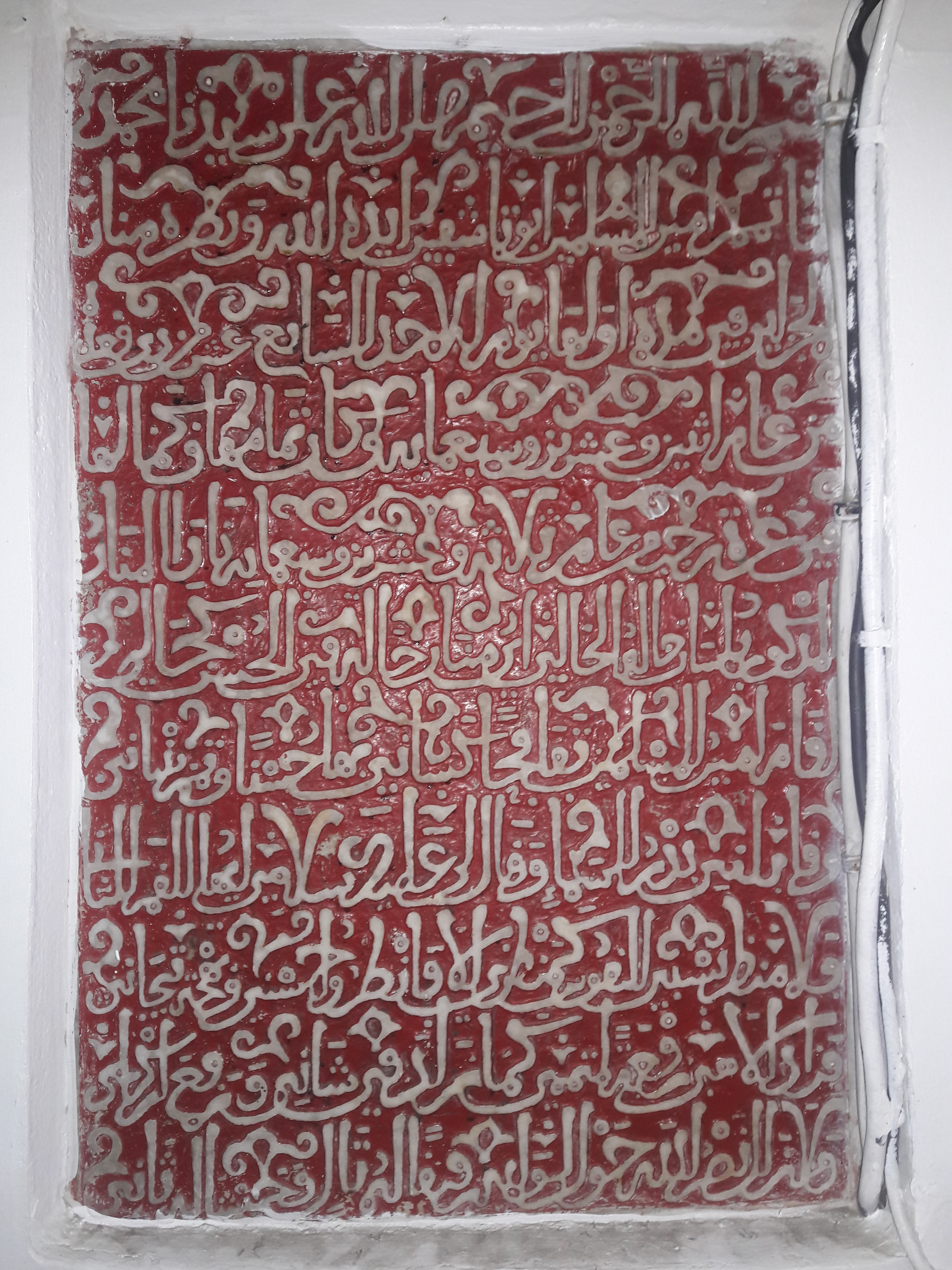
Marble inscription plaque recording the construction of the minaret in 1332

An inscription on the mosque's minbar (pulpit) records the date of 1 Rajab, 490 AH, testifying to the fact that the mosque was built in or around 1097 CE, during the reign of Yusuf ibn Tashfin. The inscription on the base of the minaret indicates that it was built in 1322 CE (17 Dhu al-Qadah, 722 AH) by the Zayyanid sultan Abu Tashfin I of Tlemcen.

The mosque was severely damaged during the French bombardment of Algiers in 1682 and again in 1683, resulting in the subsequent reconstruction of its mihrab and its qibla (southern) wall.

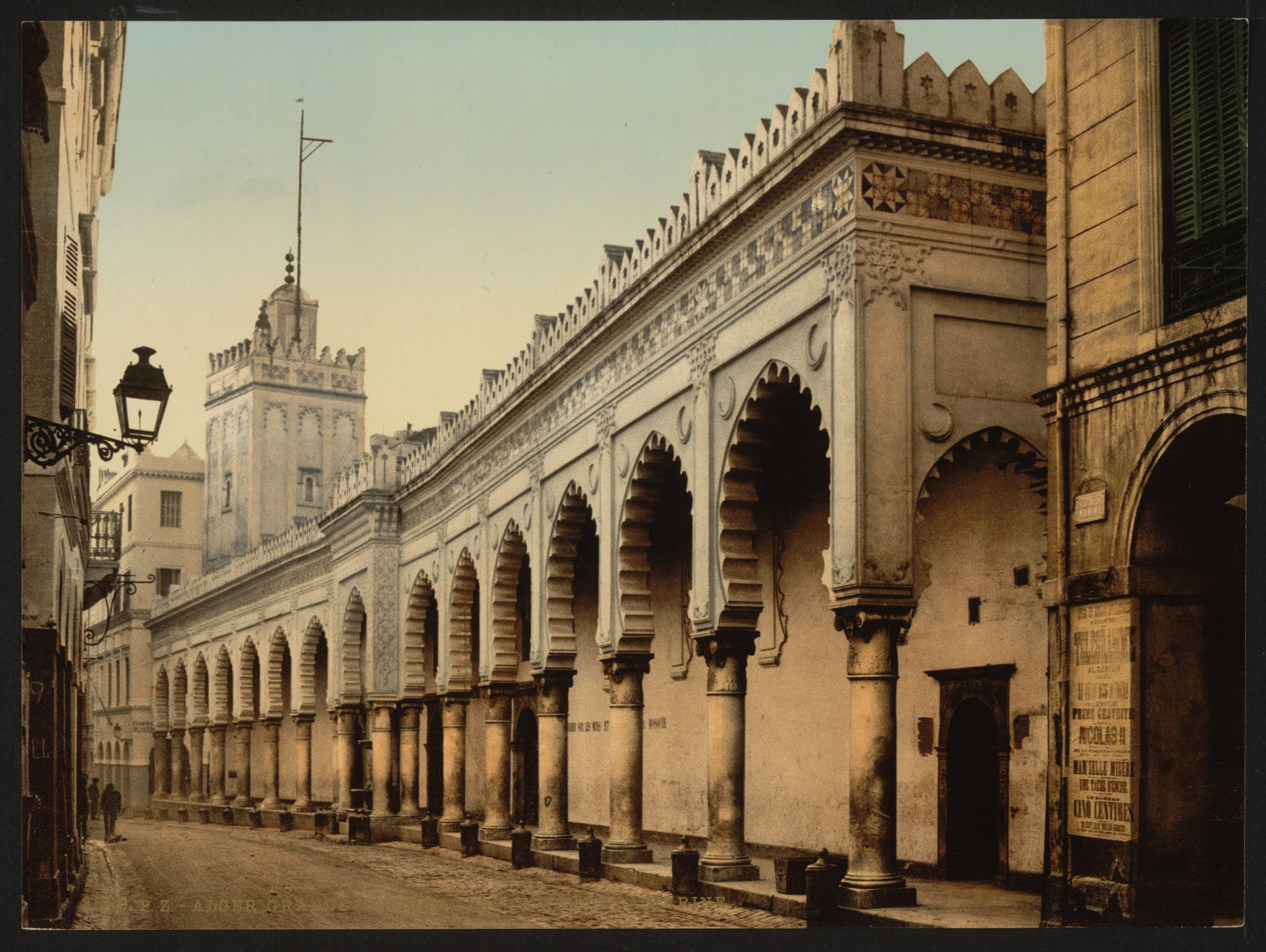
Great Mosque of Algiers in 1899

The gallery at the outside of the mosque was built in 1837 during French colonial rule. Its construction was a consequence of a complete reconstruction of the street by the French.

== Geography ==
The Great Mosque is located in the northeastern part of the city in the historic Casbah (or Kasbah) district near the harbor, next to the Chamber of Commerce. Earlier, the mosque was located on the Rue de la Marine in Algiers during French colonial rule of Algeria, which was then the entrance street to Algiers Harbor. Rue de la Marine no longer exists and has been surpassed by the Rue d' Angkor and Boulevard de Ernesto Guevara and in the mosque area by a fork road called Rue Saadi et Mokhtar Ben Hafidh which it now lies on.

== Architectural features ==
The mosque has a rectangular floor plan 46 meters wide and 38 meters deep. Materials used in constructing the mosque were stone, brick, roofing tiles and wood, and ornamentation of ceramics and wood was applied.

=== Interior ===
The prayer hall is subdivided into eleven aisles running perpendicular to the southern qibla wall, divided by rows of horseshoe arches supported by whitewashed masonry pillars. The central aisle is wider than the others, hinting at the T-plan layout which would become standard in subsequent mosque architecture in Maghreb. A rectangular courtyard measuring about 11 by 21 meters is located in the northern part of the mosque, surrounded by arcades.

The mihrab, which was originally built as an integral part of the mosque in 1097, was destroyed by the 17th-century French bombardment. The reconstructed mihrab is a typical design followed in 18th-century Algiers in the form of indented lobed arches at the end of the central and a much wider nave. It is a simple fresco façade with two small spiral columns flanking it on either side with an ogive stucco arch seen in relief. The mihrab is set in a niche with a flat floor. Adjoining the mihrab on either side, there are two door openings which lead to small oblong rooms, one of which housed the minbar which used to be shifted on rails to the prayer hall for the Imam to say the daily prayers and give sermons. While the rails that were used to shift the minbar are still embedded in the floor, the minbar itself is now preserved in the National Museum of Antiquities and Islamic Arts in Algiers.

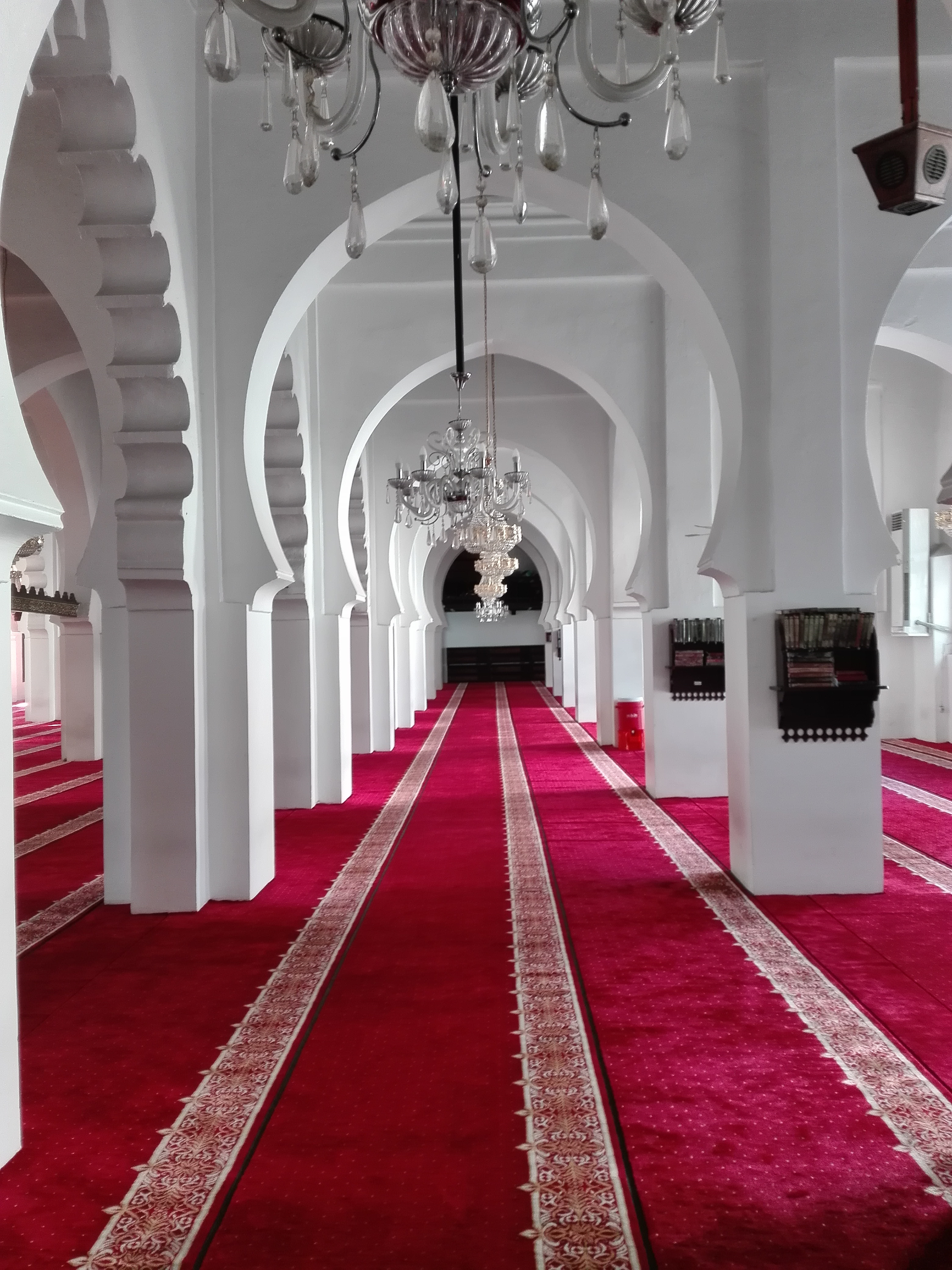
Interior of the mosque's prayer hall

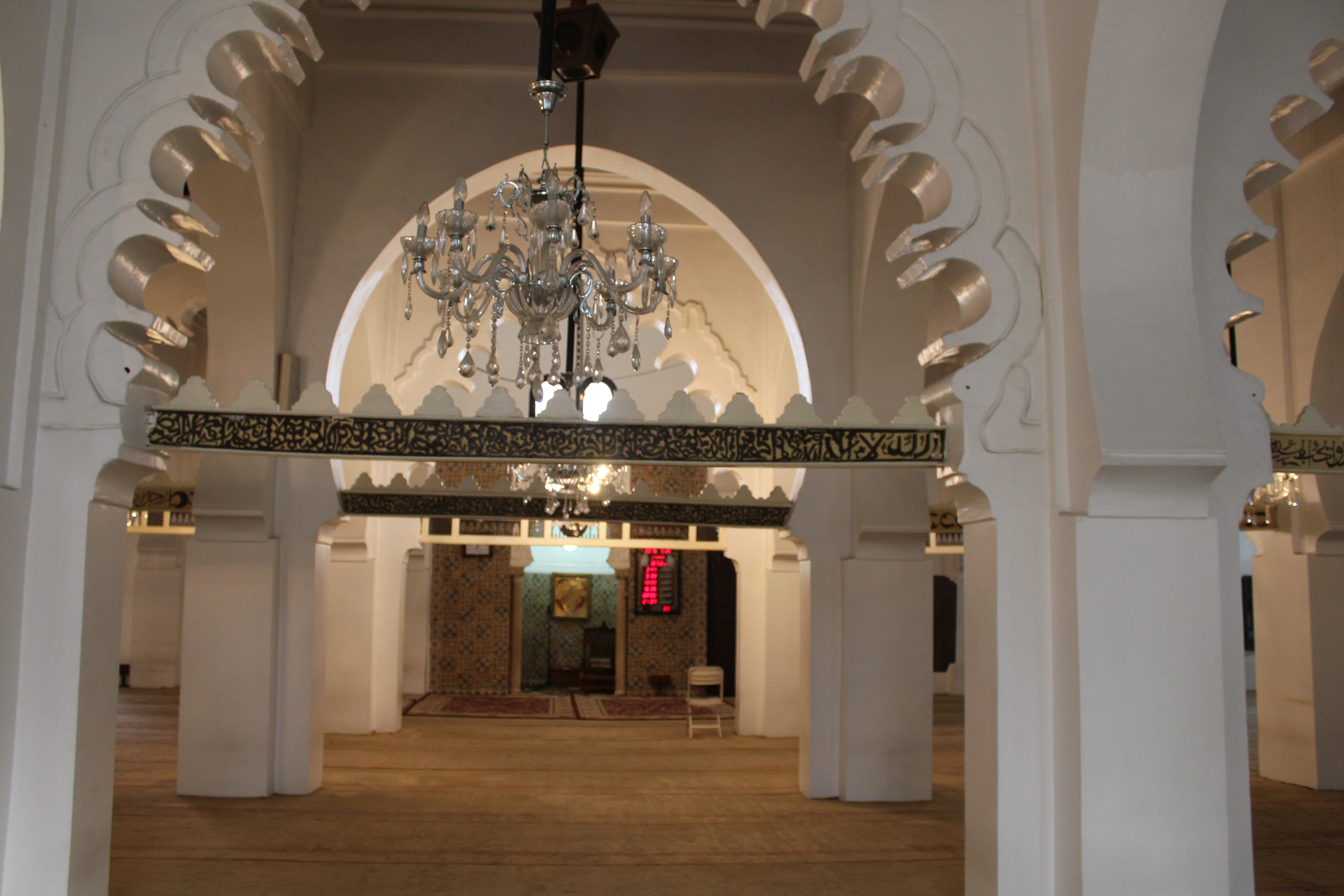
View of the aisle leading towards the mihrab

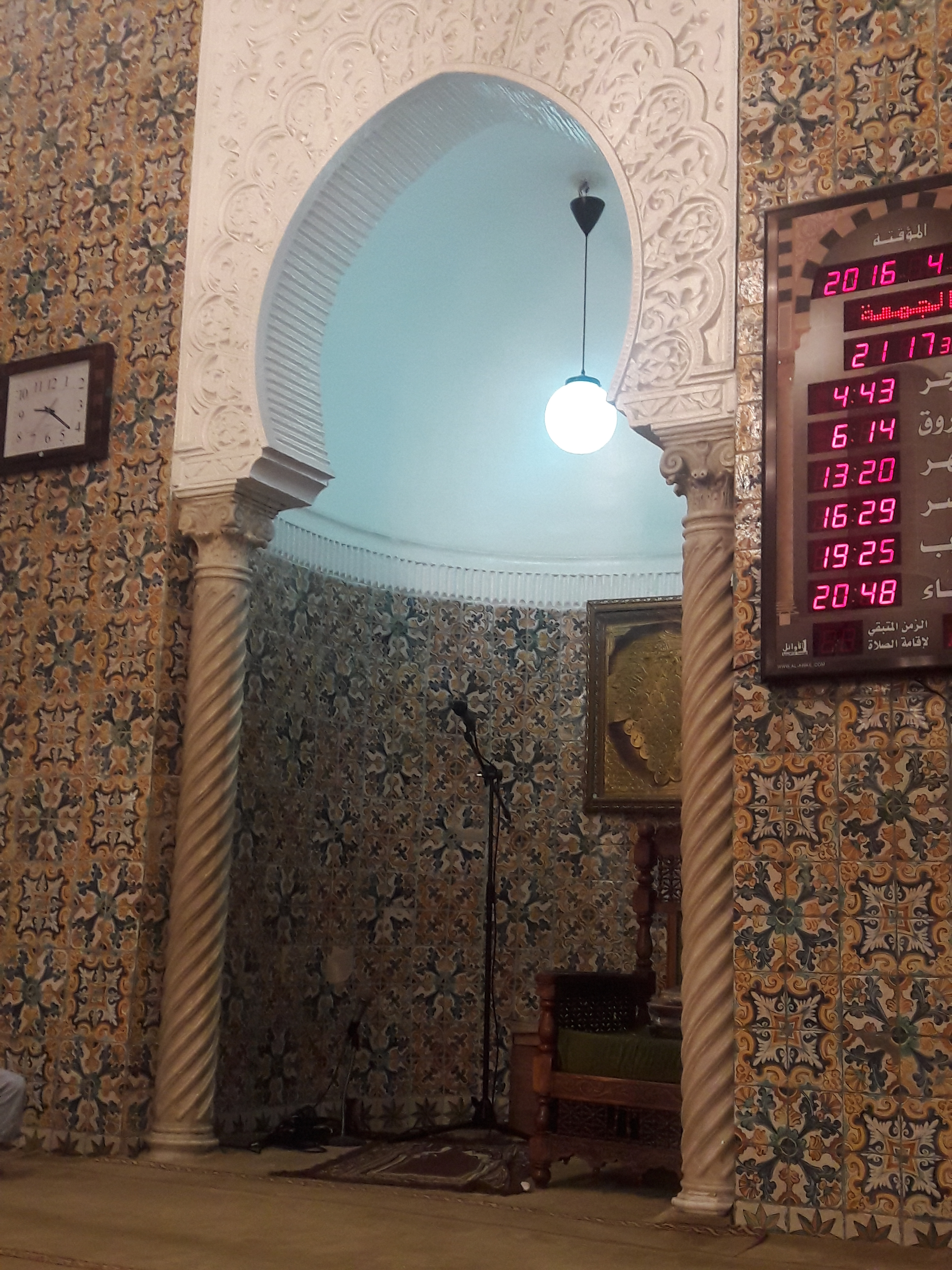
The mihrab of the mosque today

=== Exterior ===
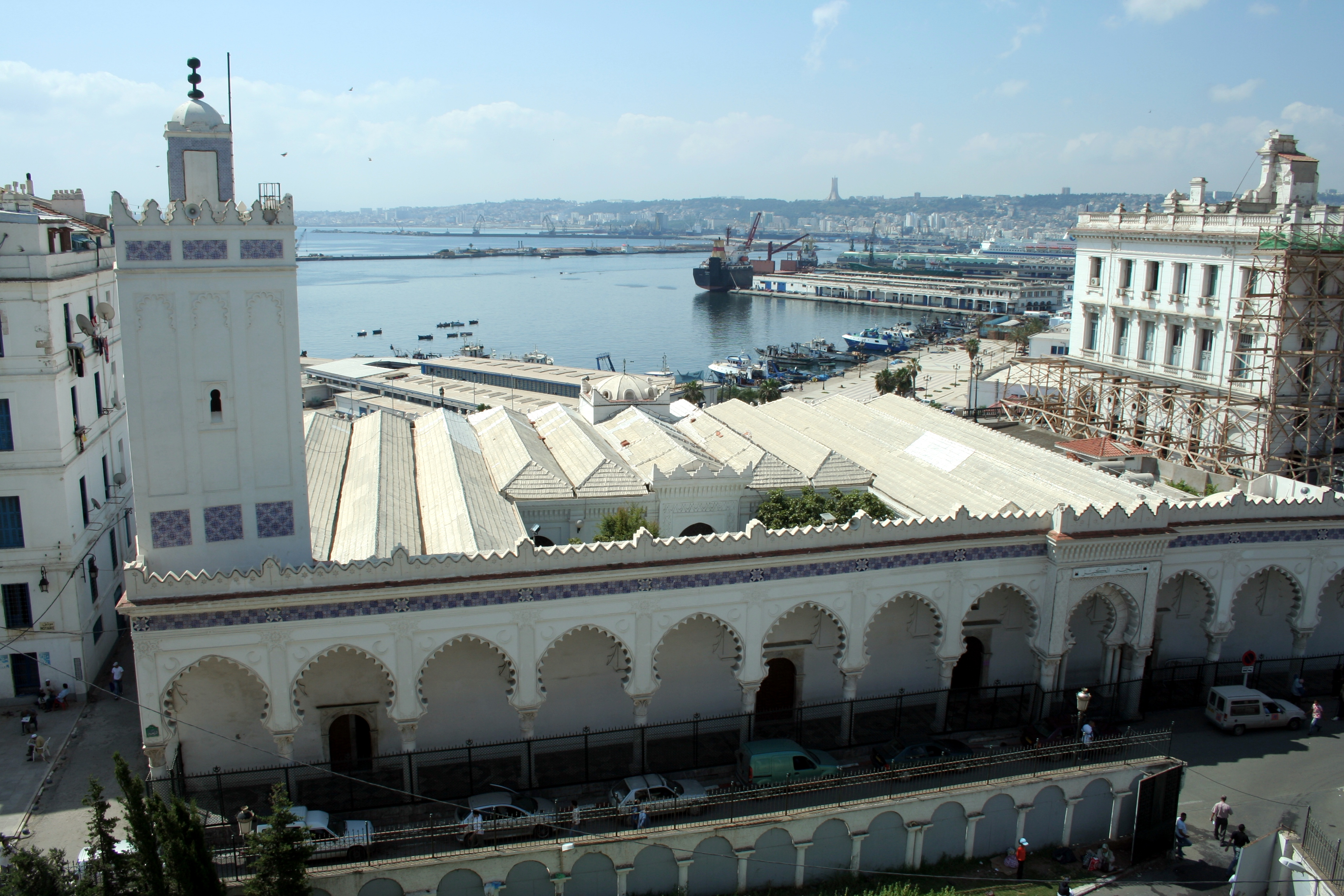
Great Mosque of Algiers in modern times

Following the realignment of the main street of Rue de la Marine, substantial changes in the façade became an essential additional feature. As a result, a gallery or portico of columns was added at the entrance to the mosque and was built in 1837 under French colonial rule in an orientalizing style of polylobed arches. It reuses Italian marble columns from the 18th-century al-Sa'ida Mosque.

According to French scholar Georges Marçais, the minaret, which was first added in the early 14th century, was rebuilt or remodelled again in a later period. This minaret's surface is indented with rectangular niches decorated by polylobed blind arches, as well as with panels and bands of blue and white ceramic tiles. In another part of the mosque, in the north-east corner, is the Bab al-Jenina which, along with the minaret, is meant for the exclusive use of the imam of the mosque. It has several rooms for routine use.

== The minbar ==
The original minbar of the mosque is now preserved in the National Museum of Antiquities and Islamic Arts. It is one of the finest sculpted minbars of its type in Algeria. It bears an inscription in Kufic Arabic script saying:

بسم الله الرحمن الرحيم أتم هذا المنبر في أول شهر رجب من سنة تسعين وأربعمائة. الذي عمل محمد
In the name of Allah, the Compassionate, the Merciful. This pulpit has been completed the first of the month of Rajab of the year 490 [AH].

— Work of Muhammad.

The minbar is sculpted in wood fixed on wheels for free movement of the Almoravid period. It is patterned in the simple shape of the paneled minbar of the Great Mosque of Kairouan.

== See also ==
- Islam in Algeria
- List of mosques in Algeria
- High medieval domes
- List of cultural assets of Algeria
- List of World Heritage Sites in Algeria
