= Salka (Sufism) =

Islamic religious practice

The salka (Arabic: السلكة) is a collective recitation of all sixty hizbs of the Quran done by murids and saliks in Islamic Sufism.

== Presentation ==
The salka is a tilawa during the meeting of the murids in a zawiya or a mosque to continuously recite the entire Quran.

Saliks and tolbas recite the salka periodically to demonstrate their memorization in the zawiyas and madrasas.

Muslims used also to perform the salka to psalmody the whole Quran either for death, childbirth, marriage contract, or moving to a new residence.

While the Hizb Rateb consists of reciting a juz' of the Quran before or after one of the obligatory Islamic salawate (prayer), the salka consists of meeting in a place where believers continuously recite all of the sixty hizbs of the Quran from Al-Fatiha to An-Nas.

== Variants ==
Depending on the season of the year, the salka can take two forms:

- The Diurnal Salka (Arabic: السلكة النهارية), during the summer, when the length of the day is longer than that of the night.
- The Night Salka (Arabic: السلكة الليلية), during the winter, when the duration of the night is longer than that of the day.

== See also ==
- Hezzab
- Bash Hezzab
- Nass al-Houdhour
- Idjaza
- Sujud Tilawa
