= Islam in Algeria =

Islam is the majority and state religion in Algeria. The vast majority of citizens are Sunni Muslims belonging to the Maliki school of jurisprudence, with a minority of Ibadi Muslims, most of whom live in the M'zab valley region. Islam provides the society with its central social and cultural identity and gives most individuals their basic ethical and attitudinal orientation. Orthodox observance of the faith is much less widespread and steadfast than is identification with Islam.

There are also Sufi philosophies which arose as a reaction to theoretical perspectives of some scholars.

== History ==
=== Arrival of Islam ===
Islam was first brought to Algeria by the Umayyad dynasty following the invasion of Uqba ibn Nafi, in a drawn-out process of conquest and conversion stretching from 670 to 711. The native Berbers rapidly converted in large numbers, although some Christian and probably pagan communities would remain at least until Almoravid times. However, as in the Middle East itself, they sought to combine their new Islam with resistance to the Caliphate's foreign rule. By the late 8th century, most of Algeria was ruled by the Rustamids, who professed the strictly puritanical but politically moderate Ibadi sect and saw the Caliphs as immoral usurpers. They were destroyed by the Shia Fatimids in 909, but their doctrine was re-established further south by refugees whose descendants would ultimately found the towns of the M'zab valley in the Algerian Sahara, where Ibadism still dominates.

Though it convinced the Kutama, the Fatimids' Ismaili doctrine remained unpopular in most of North Africa, and the Fatimids themselves abandoned Algeria for Egypt as soon as they could, leaving North Africa to a dynasty only nominally subject to them, the Zirids. With the political threat of the Abbasid Caliphate gone, these soon reverted to Sunni Islam—specifically, the Maliki branch, whose popularity had spread widely in the Maghreb. The Fatimids took their revenge by sending the Bedouin Banu Hilal to wreak havoc on the region, but were incapable of controlling it; Shiism rapidly dwindled, and became virtually non-existent in the area.

The Almohads were zealously orthodox, and under their rule Algeria gradually acquired its notable religious homogeneity. Sunni Islam and the Maliki madhhab became virtually universal, apart from the Ibadhis of the M'zab and small Jewish communities.

Islam took longer to spread to the far south of Algeria, whose history is to a large extent separate—only in the 15th century were the Tuareg finally converted to Islam.

During the Regency period, unlike the Maliki Algerian masses, the Ottoman-Algerians remained affiliated with the Hanifi school of Islamic jurisprudence. The judicial system was headed by one mufti for each of the Madhhabs represented in the Regency. Major towns had both Hanafi and Maliki mosques, while the Ibadi community had their own mosques and, especially, cemeteries. The dual Hanafi and Maliki system was maintained under French colonial regime.

=== French colonization ===
In 1830, the French conquered Algiers. Their attempts to rule the rest of the country met stiff opposition, often religiously inspired; the Sufi warrior Amir Abd al-Qadir was particularly notable for his campaign to keep the French out. Even after his defeat, rebellions continued to be mounted until at least 1870, notably that of Sheikh Mokrani; again, a religious motivation was notable in most, though not all, of these.

Soon after arriving in Algeria, the French colonial regime set about undermining traditional Muslim Algerian culture. By French law Muslims could not hold public meetings, carry firearms, or leave their homes or villages without permission. Legally, they were French subjects, but to become French citizens—with full rights—they had to renounce Islamic law. Few did so. The land of Islamic charitable trusts (habus) was regarded as government property and confiscated. Much of the network of traditional Quranic schools and zawiyas—regarded with suspicion as centers of potential resistance—collapsed, and the literacy rate fell.

However, the emergence of the religious scholar and reformer Abdel-Hamid ibn Badis would go some way to reversing these trends. Beginning in the 1910s, he preached against the traditional marabouts and the saint cults, they believed in voodoo dolls, and urged the importance of Arabic and Islamic education; his disciples founded an extensive network of schools, and rapidly brought the saint cults into widespread disrepute, making Algerian Islam substantially more orthodox.

The discrimination against Islam led it to be a strong element of the resistance movement to the French in the Algerian war of independence. The independence fighters were termed moudjahidine practicers of jihad—and its fallen are called chouhada ("martyrs") despite the revolution's avowed socialism; even during the revolution, the FLN made symbolic efforts to impose Islamic principles, such as banning wine and prostitution.

=== Post-independence ===
After independence, the Algerian government asserted state control over religious activities for purposes of national consolidation and political control. Islam became the religion of the state in the new constitution (Article 2), and was the religion of its leaders. The state monopolized the building of mosques, and the Ministry of Religious Affairs controlled an estimated 5,000 public mosques by the mid-1980s. Imams were trained, appointed, and paid by the state, and the Friday khutba—or sermon—was issued to them by the Ministry of Religious Affairs. That ministry also administered religious property (the habus), provided for religious education and training in schools, and created special institutes for Islamic learning. Islamic law (sharia) principles were introduced into family law in particular, while remaining absent from most of the legal code; thus, for example, while Muslim women were banned from marrying non-Muslims (by the Algerian Family Code of 1984), wine remained legal.

Those measures, however, did not satisfy everyone. As early as 1964 a militant Islamic movement, called al-Qiyam al-Islāmiyya (values), emerged and became the precursor of the Islamic Salvation Front (an Islamist party) of the 1990s. Al-Qiyam al-Islāmiyya called for a more dominant role for Islam in Algeria's legal and political systems and opposed what it saw as Western practices in the social and cultural life of Algerians. This proved to be the most difficult challenge for the immediate post-independent regimes as they tried to incorporate an Islamic national identity alongside socialist policies. While the new leaders of Algeria saw Islam and socialism as compatible and both features of Algerian culture and society, radical Islamists saw Islam as the only defining characteristic and as incompatible with socialism.

Houari Boumédiène largely contained militant Islamism during his reign, although it remained throughout the 1970s under a different name and with a new organization. Following Boumediene's death, Chadli Bendjedid became president in 1979. Chadli's regime was much more tolerant with Islamists, and with Algeria in the midst of an socio-economic crisis including unemployment and inflation, social tensions were high. Policies of Arabization (increasing Arabic education and the use of Arabic in professional institutions) had failed to come to fruition: French remained the language of the political elite and French speaking students were prioritised for jobs. Thus, the movement began spreading to university campuses where it was encouraged by the state as a counterbalance to left-wing student movements. By the 1980s, the movement had become even stronger, and bloody clashes erupted at the Ben Aknoun campus of the University of Algiers in November 1982. The violence resulted in the state's cracking down on the movement, a confrontation that would intensify throughout the 1980s and early 1990s.

The rise of Islamism had a significant impact on Algerian society. More women began wearing the veil, some because they had become more conservative religiously and others because the veil kept them from being harassed on the streets, on campuses, or at work. Islamists also prevented the enactment of a more liberal family code despite pressure from feminist groups and associations.

After the Islamic Salvation Front (FIS) won the 1991 elections, and was then banned after the elections' cancellation by the military, the tensions between Islamists and the government erupted into open fighting, which lasted some 10 years in the course of which some 100,000 people were killed. However, some Islamist parties remained aboveground—notably the Movement of Society for Peace and Islamic Renaissance Movement—and were allowed by the government to contest later elections. In recent years, the Civil Harmony Act and Charter for Peace and National Reconciliation have been passed, providing an amnesty for most crimes committed in the course of the war.

== Practice ==
Sunni Islam is quasi universal, apart for the Mozabite Berbers who are mainly Ibadi Muslims. The dominant madhhab is Maliki. There are a few followers of the Hanafi rite among people of Turkish descent. Sufi brotherhoods have retreated considerably, but remain in some areas. Algerians have a Muslim tradition of patron saints, although it is viewed as shirk by Salafis and Wahhabis. The most famous saints who remain local patrons of the cities where their tombs are situated are Sidi Abdul-Rahman al-Tha'alibi in Algiers, Sidi el-Houari in Oran and Sidi Boumédiène at Tlemcen.

== In politics ==
The popularity of Islamism fluctuates according to circumstance; in the 2002 elections, legal Islamist parties received some 20% of the seats in the National Assembly, way down from the FIS's 50% in 1991. Conversely, there is strong anti-Islamist sentiment from secular parties such as the Rally for Culture and Democracy (RCD) and the Algerian Workers' Party. Support for Islamist parties is especially low in the Kabylie region, where the FIS obtained no seats in 1991, the majority being taken by the Socialist Forces Front, another secular party.

The recent rise of a number of radical religious movements involving Ahmadism, Salafism, Wahhabism, and takfiri ideology have raised concerns among officials in the Algerian Ministry of Religious Affairs and Endowments, which has decided to take action by strengthening the monitoring and control of places targeted by the radical Islamists for recruits.

== See also ==
- Glossary of Islam
- Outline of Islam
- Index of Islam-related articles
- Religion in Algeria
  - Ministry of Religious Affairs and Endowments in Algeria
  - Algerian Islamic reference
  - List of Algerian saints
  - Sunni Islam in Algeria
  - Malikism in Algeria
  - Sunni Islam in Algeria
  - Sufism in Algeria
  - Ashura in Algeria
  - Mawlid in Algeria
  - Zawiyas in Algeria
  - Muftis in Algiers
  - List of mosques in Algeria
- Islam by country
- Algerian civil war
