= Tilawa =

Recitation of Quran verses

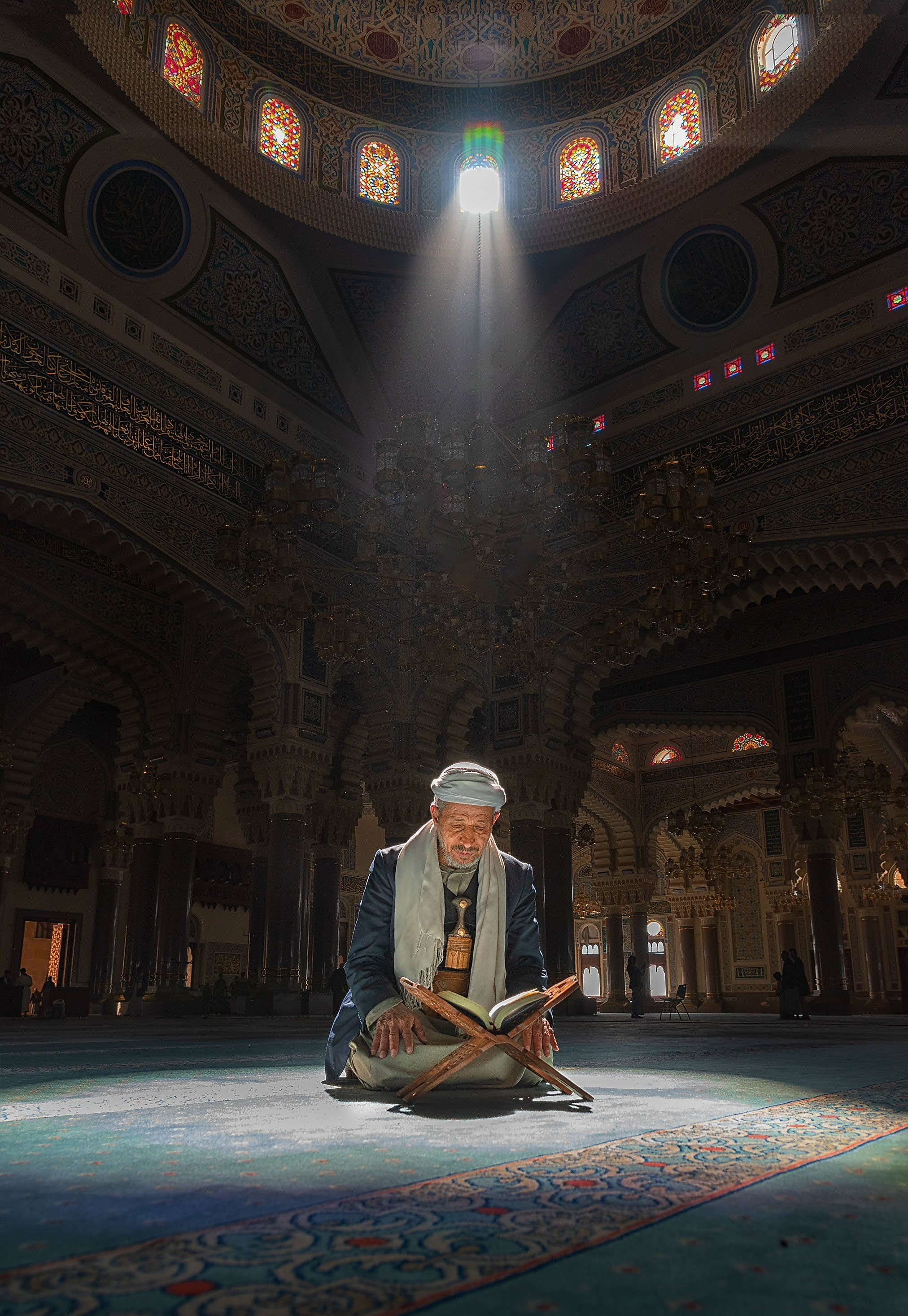
Man reading the Quran in al-Saleh Mosque

The Tilawa (Arabic: تِلَاوَة) is a recitation of the successive verses of the Qur'ān in a standardized and proven manner according to the rules of the ten recitations.

== Presentation ==
1. The Tilawa of the Quran is given in terms and meanings, because the Qira'at or recitation of the pronouncement of successive verses is part of the term following the accepted reading of Allah's Book.

One of the meanings of the Tilawa of the Quran is that the qāriʾ who reads must rationalize what they are reading and follow the directions contained in what they are reading.

== Levels ==
In the science of tajweed, the qāriʾ needs to know the levels or ranks in which they recite the tilawa, and these four ranks are all mubah or permissible, which are:

1. Tarteel (Arabic: تَرْتِيلٌ).
2. Tadweer (Arabic: تَدْوِيرٌ).
3. Tahqeeq (Arabic: تَحْقِيقٌ).
4. Hadr (Arabic: حَدْرٌ).

== Mastery ==
Mastering the tilawa recitation requires knowing its ranks and levels in order to apply the requirements of that while reading verses of the Quran seeking reward from Allah Almighty.

This is because mastering the tarteel is done through reading the Quran calmly and without haste, while contemplating the meanings and taking into account the provisions of intonation, and this is a characteristic inherent in all levels of clear reading.

The mastery of Tadweer is by mediating recitation between Tahqeeq and Hadr, taking into account the provisions of Tajweed, and comes after Tarteel in the second place of preference.

Good performance in Tahqeeq is by giving each letter of the verses its right to satisfy the tide and achieve the whisper, which is more reassuring than Tarteel, which is the desirable position of teaching, but it must be avoided from stretching and excessive satisfaction of pronunciation movements; So as not to generate some letters from it, from exaggerated singing to other things that are not correct in Quran recitation.

The distinguished performance of the Hadr rank is by reading the verses quickly, taking into account the provisions of Tajweed from the letters and qualities of words, in contrast to the rank of Tahqeeq.

== Sujud Tilawa ==
The Sujud Tilawa is done during the Tilawa recitation of the Quran individually or in the Hizb Rateb or the Salka, including Salah in congregation, because there are fifteen places where Muslims believe, when Muhammad recited a certain verse (ayah), he ۩ prostrated a sujud to Allah Almighty.

== See also ==
- Qāriʾ
- Hafiz
- Qira'at
- Tarteel
- Tajweed
- ۩ Sujud Tilawa
