= Hizb Rateb =

Religious ritual in Islamic Sufism

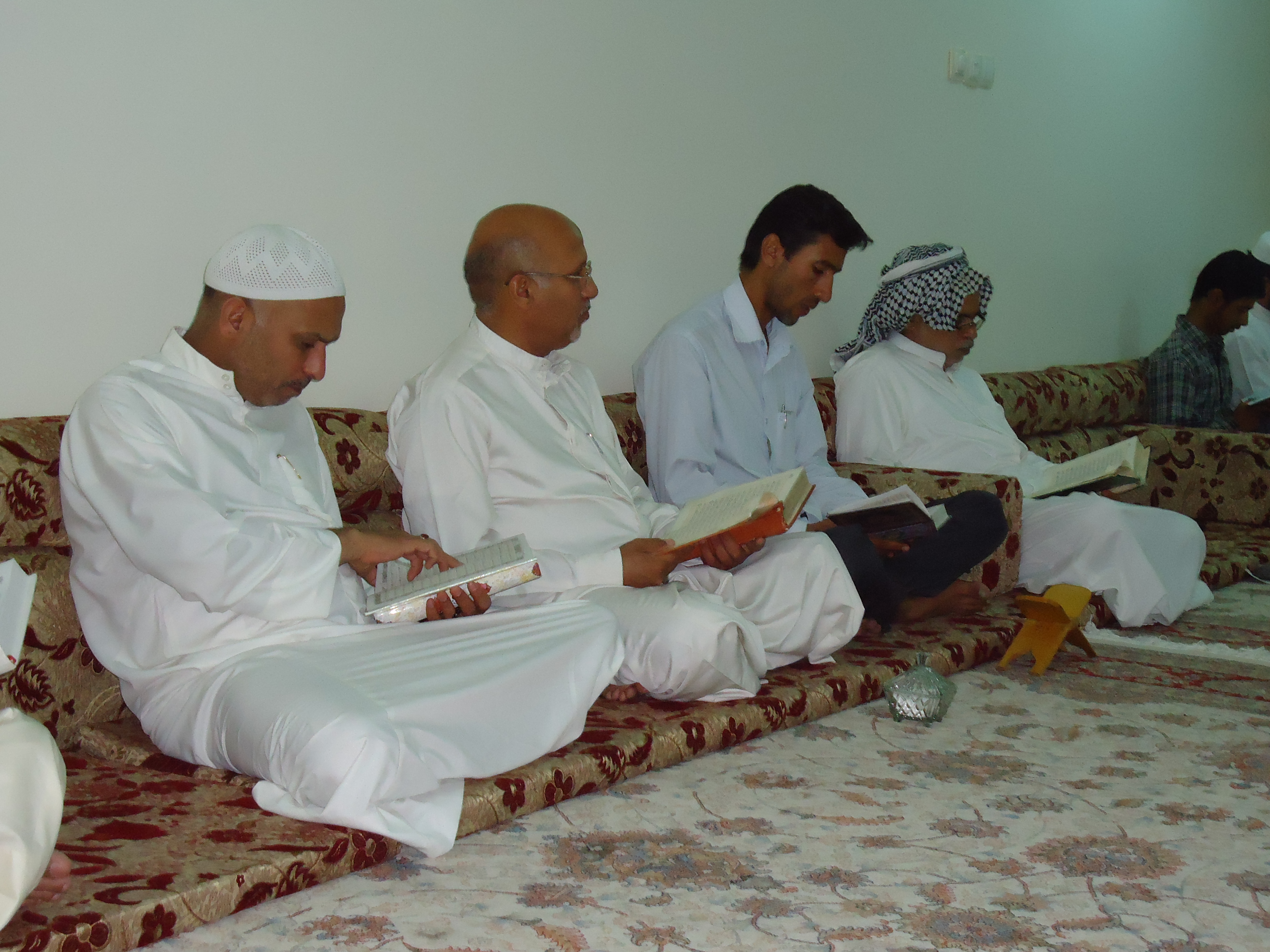
- Quran Tilawa
- Official name: الحزب الراتب
- Also called: تلاوة القرآن الجماعية
- Observed by: Muslims
- Type: Islam, Quran, Tilawa, Mosque
- Significance: Collective recitation of Quran
- Begins: After Fajr prayer; Before Zuhr prayer; Before Asr prayer; After Maghrib prayer
- Duration: Tilawa of 1 or 2 hizbs
- Frequency: Daily
- Related to: Islam, Quran, Tilawa, Salka

The Hizb Rateb (Arabic: الحزب الراتب) is a collective recitation of Quran or dhikr or dua or wird done by murids and saliks in islamic sufism.

== Presentation ==
The Hizb Rateb is a group tilawa of the Quran with one voice, in mosques, zawiyas, kuttabs and Quranic schools.

This custom has been practiced in the Maghreb countries since the tenth hijri century under the Almohad Caliphate, after Sheikh Abdullah Al-Habati created the rules for collective reading with one tone.

It has an allocated and known times, because it may be recitated after the Fajr prayer or after the Maghrib prayer.

It may also be recitated before the Zuhr prayer or before the Asr prayer.

Thus, in the countries of the Maghreb, the muslims used to recite the Quran together in what is known as the Hizb Rateb, in line with the current custom in these states.

== See also ==
- Hezzab
- Bash Hezzab
- Nass al-Houdhour
- Salka
- Tilawa
- Idjaza
- Sujud Tilawa
