= Tawassul =

Islamic understanding of intercession

Those whom they invoke seek means of access to their Lord, [striving as to] which of them would be nearest, and they hope for His mercy and fear His punishment. Indeed, the punishment of your Lord is ever feared.— Surah al-Isra, verse 57

Tawassul (Arabic: توسل) is an Arabic word derived from wasilah (Arabic: وسيلة), which refers to "a means by which a person, goal or objective is approached, attained or achieved". According to Ibn Manzur (d. 711/1311) in Lisān al-'Arab, wasilah also means "a station of King, a rank, or act of devotion". In this sense, it refers to a position of power resulting from one's proximity to a king or sovereign. Tawassul is the use of wasilah for this purpose. In religious contexts, tawassul is the use of a wasilah to approach Allah or obtain His favour.

== Etymology ==
Tawassul is an Arabic word derived from the verbal noun wasilah (Arabic: وسيلة), which means "closeness, nearness, proximity, neighbourship". According to Ibn Manzur (d. 711/1311) in Lisān al-'Arab, wasilah means "a station of King, a rank, or act of devotion". The word wasilah appears twice in the Quran (5:35 and 17:57). The word is translated as “a means that can be used to gain nearness to God”. Therefore, the typical meaning of tawassul is the use of a means to obtain nearness to God.

Requesting assistance from a spiritual intermediary when seeking divine help. In conservative interpretations, only Muhammad can intercede with God on behalf of human beings because Islam teaches that every believer has direct access to God. In Sufism and popular practice, intercession is often asked of saints or holy people. Some reform movements oppose requests for intercession.

— The Oxford Dictionary of Islam

== Concept ==
Tawassul, as a major practice in supplications, plays a key role in its acceptance.

O you who believe! be careful of (your duty to) Allah and seek means (wasilah) of nearness to Him and strive hard in His way that you may be successful

— Surah al-Ma'idah, verse 35

Some classical commentators, including prominent Sufi exegetes such as al-Qushayri (d. 465/1074), explains the use of wasilah in this verse as referring to avoiding what is prohibited, fulfilling what is enjoined upon us, and drawing near to God through good actions. Both Raghib al-Isfahani and Sayyid Muhammad Husayn Tabataba'i interpret wasilah to mean to reach a certain goal through desire, inclination and willingness. In fact, wasilah towards God means observance of His path through knowledge and worship, in adherence to the Sharia. It can be deduced from the verse above that intercession (tawassul) is only with the permission of Allah. Also, the practice of seeking intercession began during the time of the Islamic prophet Muhammad. An oft-cited Hadith in support of this is narrated from Uthman ibn Hunaif regarding a blind man who Muslims believe was healed through this process. The Hadith is as follows:

A blind man came to the Messenger of Allah (Allah bless him & give him peace) and said: "I've been afflicted in my eyesight, so pray to Allah for me". The Prophet (Allah bless him & give him peace) said: "Go perform ablution (Wudu), perform two Rak’at Salat and then say: "O Allah! I ask you and turn to you through my Prophet Muhammad, the Prophet of Mercy. O Muhammad! I seek your intercession with my lord for the return of my eyesight, that it may be fulfilled. O Allah! Grant him intercession for me". The Messenger of Allah (Allah bless him & give him peace) then said: "and if there is some other need, do the same"

— Recorded by Ibn Majah: 1385, Tirmidhi, Abu Dawud, Nasa'i, Tabarani and others, with a sound chain of narrators.

== In the Quran ==
The Qur'an states:

If, when they had wronged themselves, they had come to you, and asked forgiveness from God, and the Messenger had asked forgiveness for them, they would have found God Relenting, Merciful.

— Surah an-Nisa, verse 64

This verse raised the question of whether or not Muhammad's mediation was still possible after his death. A number of Islamic scholars, including Al-Nawawi, Ibn Kathir, and Ibn al-Athir relate the following episode in their exegeses, aiming to demonstrate its effectiveness:

A Bedouin of the desert visited the Prophet's tomb and greeted the Prophet, addressing him directly as if he were alive. "Peace upon you, Messenger of God!" Then he said, "I heard the word of God 'If, when they had wronged themselves...,' I came to you seeking pardon for my mistakes, longing for your intercession with our Lord!" The Bedouin then recited a poem in praise of the Prophet and departed. The person who witnessed the story says that he fell asleep, and in a dream he saw the Prophet saying to him, “O ‘Utbi, rejoin our brother the Bedouin and announce [to] him the good news that God has pardoned him!"

The Qur'an also states:

O believers! Fear Allah and seek means (of approach to) His (presence and to His nearness and accessibility) and strive in His way so that you may prosper

— Surah al-Ma'idah, verse 35

The above verse lays emphasis on four things:

- Faith
- Piety
- Search for means of approach
- Struggle for the sake of Allah

According to the verse, the third instruction, after faith in God and piety, is to "seek means (of approach to) His (presence and to His nearness and accessibility)". Some religious scholars have interpreted wasilah (the means of approach) mentioned in the Quranic verse as faith and good deeds, while other scholars have interpreted the word as referring to the prophets, the righteous, and the awliya of Allah.

The verse also reveals that a person seeking means of approach to Allah must first be a believer and among the Muttaqeen (those who fear Allah). Thus, according to the opinion of Muhammad Tahir-ul-Qadri, wasilah does not amount to associating partners with Allah, but rather reaffirms His oneness.

== Types ==
There is agreement among Muslim theologians that seeking nearness through a means (tawassul) is an acceptable way to draw near to Allah, but they cannot reach unanimity on what kinds of tawassul are permissible. According to the general agreement, people can draw near to Allah and invoke Him by using permissible means, such as their good deeds (prayer, fasting, and reciting the Quran).

However, there is disagreement over approaching Allah through the person of Muhammad and his dignity, or through other pious Muslims, after their death.

== Sunni perspective ==
Various episodes in the life of Muhammad depict him interceding on behalf of his companions, often asking God to forgive their sins (Istighfar). For example, Aisha relates that he often slipped quietly from her side at night to go to the cemetery of Al-Baqi' to beseech God to forgive the dead. Similarly, his istighfar is mentioned in the Salat al-Janazah and its efficacy explained.

Jurists belonging to the Shafi'i, Maliki, Hanafi and Hanbali schools are unanimous on the permissibility of tawassul, whether during the lifetime of Muhammad or after his death. Syrian Islamic scholars Salih al-Nu`man, Abu Sulayman Suhayl al-Zabibi, and Mustafa ibn Ahmad al-Hasan al-Shatti al-Hanbali al-Athari al-Dimashqi have similarly issued rulings in support of the practice.

Al-Suyuti, in his book History of the Caliphs, also reports Caliph Umar's prayer for rain after the death of Muhammad and specifies that, on that occasion, ‘Umar was wearing his mantle (al-burda), a detail confirming his tawassul through Muhammad on that occasion. Imam al-Bukhari, in his Sahih, narrates a similar situation as follows:

Whenever there was drought, 'Umar bin Al-Khattab used to ask Allah for rain through Al-‘Abbas ibn ‘Abd al-Muttalib, saying, "O Allah! We used to request our Prophet to ask You for rain, and You would give us. Now we request the uncle of our Prophet to ask You for rain, so give us rain." And they would be given rain."

— Sahih al-Bukhari Book 57 Hadith 59

In South Asia, Barelvis support tawassul, while the Deobandis and Wahhabis oppose it.

== Shia perspective ==
Seeking intercession, similar to the Sunni school of thought, is widely accepted and even advised in Shia Islam. Shia scholars refer to Quranic verses such as 5:3, 12:97 and 12:98 and justify its permissibility. During tawassul, Shia Muslims call on the names of Muhammad and the Ahl al-Bayt and use them as their intercessors/intermediaries to God. Shi'is always pray to and only to Allah, but, like other Muslims, they accept tawassul as a means of seeking intercession.

Shia Muslims consider tawassul through prophets and imams to be a valid form of wasilah, because they believe that these figures had attained a high degree of humanity after death (i.e. they are alive and they are blessed by Allah). They therefore regard them as means that people use to gain nearness to Allah. Shia Muslims do not consider tawassul to be an innovation, or an act of polytheism. According to their beliefs, those who prohibit tawassul fail to recognise that these means were created by Allah and that their effects originate from Him.

Shia Muslims visit the graves of imams and prophets of Allah and consider this a means of gaining nearness to Him.
