= Warsh recitation =

Recitation of the Quran

The Warsh recitation, or riwāyat Warsh ʿan Nāfiʿ' (Arabic: رواية ورش عن نافع), is a qiraʿat of the Quran in Islam.

Alongside the Hafs recitation tradition which represents the recitation tradition of Kufa, it is one of the two main oral transmissions of the Quran in the Muslim world.

== Presentation ==
This qirāʾah or recitation of the Quran (literally "reading") is conducted according to the rules of tajwid, in accordance with the ahruf.

This method is attributed to Warsh, who himself obtained it from his teacher Nafiʽ al-Madani, who was one of the seven readers who transmitted the Ten Readings.

The recitation of Warsh is one of the two major traditions of qirāʾāt.

== History ==
This recitation relates to Imam Warsh (716-813 CE), whose real name is Uthman Ibn Sa‘id al-Qutbi and was born in Egypt.

His nickname Warsh (Arabic: وَرْش), a milk substance, came from his teacher Nafiʽ al-Madani due to his fair complexion.

He studied his recitation according to Naafiʽ in Medina.

After completing his studies, he returned to Egypt where he became the senior Qāriʾ of the Quran.

In the tenth century, the Muslim scholar Abu Bakr Ibn Mujāhid canonized the seven readings of the Quran, including Warsh ʽan Naafiʽ.

Although having emerged in Egypt, the recitation of Warsh ʽan Naafiʽ has become widespread in North Africa.

In medieval times, it was the main Quranic recitation in Al-Andalus.

The transmission of Warsh ʽan Naafiʽ represents the reciting tradition of Medina.

== Gallery ==
=== Warsh recitation with Maghrebi script ===
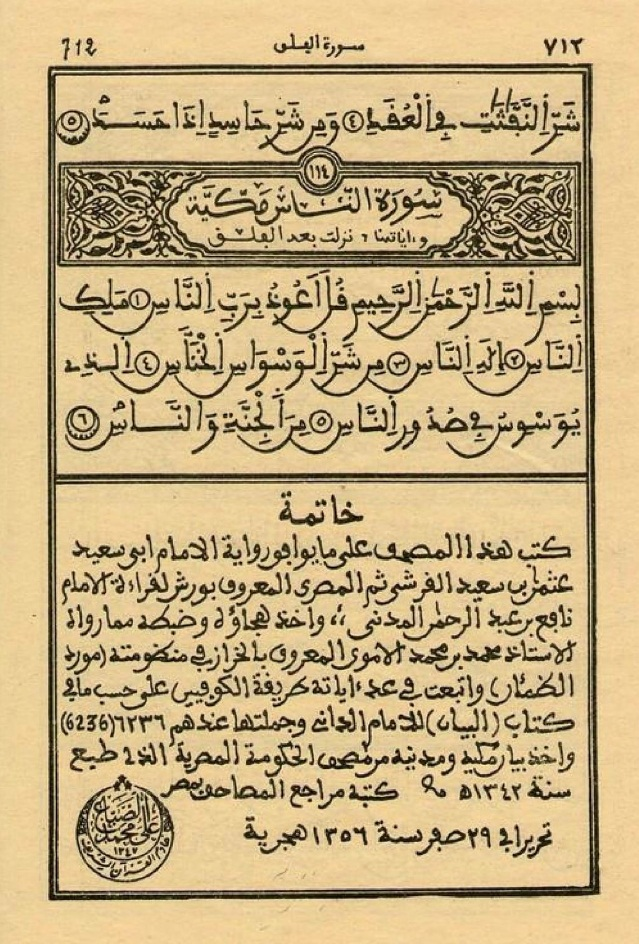
End of the Thaalibia Quran.

== See also ==
- Hizb Rateb
- Salka (Sufism)
- Ijazah
