= Boumerdassi =

Boumerdassi may refer to:

- Cheikh Boumerdassi, leader of the Mokrani Revolt uprising of 1871
- Mohamed Boumerdassi (1936–2010), Algerian artist and Bedouin singer

== See also ==
- Boumerdès (disambiguation)
- Zawiyet Sidi Boumerdassi, in Algeria
