= Capture of Palestro (1871) =

Capture Of Palestro (1871)
- Part of Mokrani Revolt
Date	April 20, 1871 – April 22, 1871
Location	Lakhdaria, Algeria
Result	Algerian victory

Belligerents
Kingdom of Ait Abbas; Zawiyas	France

Commanders and leaders
Cheikh Hammami	(France) Alexandre Fourchault

Strength
Unknown	Unknown

Casualties and losses
Unknown	46

The Capture Of Palestro was a battle that happened during the Mokrani Revolt between the Algerian insurgents and the French in 1871.

== Background ==
As the uprising extended along the coastal areas initially and later into the eastern mountains of Mitidja, reaching as far as Constantine, it continued its progression into the Belezma mountains. It interlinked with indigenous revolts, extending all the way down to the Sahara desert. The momentum of these events moved steadily towards the city of Algiers itself, Eventually they reached Lakhdaria.

== Battle ==
A gathering of Algerian Insurgency leaders was made and it was in this assembly that the decision to attack the village of Palestro was made, occurring on April 20 and lasting forty-eight hours. Following this, the city presented a woeful sight houses partially destroyed, belongings scattered haphazardly on the ground. A heart-wrenching detail: 46 French victims lay lifeless, while others vanished without a trace ever being found, The city was then captured by the insurgents.

== Aftermath ==
Marching from Palestro towards Algiers, the insurgents faced a halt at Boudouaou on April 22, 1871, thwarted by Colonel Alexandre Fourchault under the leadership of General Orphis Léon Lallemand. This encounter on May 5 resulted in a devastating defeat for Cheikh Mokrani.
