= Zawiyet Sidi Boumerdassi =

Building in Algeria

- زاوية سيدي بومرداسي
- Other names: زاوية سيدي علي البومرداسي
- Former names: زاوية بومرداس
- Type: Zawiya
- Established: 1714 CE / 1158 AH
- Founders: Sidi Ali Boumerdassi
- Affiliations: Ministry of Religious Affairs and Endowments
- Religious affiliation: Qadiriyya - Rahmaniyya
- Location: Ouled Boumerdès, Tidjelabine, Kabylia, Boumerdès Province, 35021, Algeria; 36.6774379°N 3.5185647°E
- Language: Arabic, Kabyle

Zawiyet Sidi Boumerdassi (Arabic: زاوية سيدي البومرداسي) or Zawiyet Ouled Boumerdès is a zawiya located within Boumerdès Province in Algeria.

== Construction ==
The zawiya of Ouled Boumerdès was built in 1714 in the southern heights of the current town of Boumerdès within the Kabylia region.

The founder of this Sufi school is the great scholar Sidi Ali bin Ahmed bin Muhammad al-Boumerdassi, who established this zawiya of education, which served as a beacon for the people of the Khachna mountains region, and its scientific and light rays extend to the outskirts of the homeland.

== Missions ==
The zawiya of Sidi Ali Boumerdassi in Ouled Boumerdès village is considered a prominent religious teacher in memorizing and indoctrinating the Quran and its basic rulings for young people and providing the various mosques of Boumerdes Province during the month of Ramadan every year with a preservation that leads to Tarawih prayers by reciting the Quran with the Warsh recitation.

This zawiya, which opened its doors in 1714, has an important place in its fields of formation, as it had annually graduated about 70 male and female Hafiz of the Quran with its rulings and the Hadith that he depends on in framing the various mosques of the province.

It is a place to study and teach the Quran, as well as providing aid to the needy and those about to get married and organizing circumcision ceremonies.

It is one of the Zawiyas in Algeria that plays an important role in social life in Tidjelabine region, and it is considered a modernized corner, as it is based on the traditional and modern way of teaching the Qur’an and Sunnah as well.

The learner intends to write the verses by himself using the traditional ink, which is a special ink that the learner makes from sheep's wool, where he melts it on fire until it becomes black, then mixes it with water, and the characteristic of this ink is that it does not disappear from the written tablet except by rubbing it with clay and water.

== Celebrations ==
The most important annual activities that the zawiya staff ensures to establish regularly and at a fixed date annually is the occasion of commemorating the Mawlid, during which graduates from zawiya are honored and graduation certificates distributed to them.

This is because the zawiya is a place to establish the remembrance and memorize the Quran, and it is similar to a boarding school for teaching the Book of Allah.

== History ==
=== Ottoman Algeria ===
During the Ottoman presence in Algeria, this zawiya was respected by the deys of Algiers and by the qaids who managed the affairs of the region of the mountains of Khachna.

For approximately 116 years from 1714 CE until the French conquest of Algeria in 1830 CE, this zaouïa carried out its duty of religious and mystical education in the eastern suburbs of the Casbah of Algiers on the route connecting Dar Es-Soltane to East Beylik.

The Sufi tradition which was practiced at the time in the Algerian was either the Qadiriyya, the Shadhiliyya or the Tijaniyya, and as the zawiyas of Kabylia were of Sufi order of the Qadiriyya, this zawiya of Sidi Ali Boumerdassi did not derogate to the local rule, and thus the spiritual teachings were according to the rite of Sidi Abdul Qadir Gilani (1078-1166 CE).

When the theologian Sidi M'hamed Bou Qobrine (died 1793) returned from the Al-Azhar University in Egypt, he founded the brotherhood of Rahmaniyya in Kabylia which spread throughout Algeria and beyond, and so the Zawiyet Sidi Boumerdassi adapted his initiatory and transcendent program with this brotherhood which is inspired by the Khalwatiyya.

=== Invasion of Algiers in 1830 ===
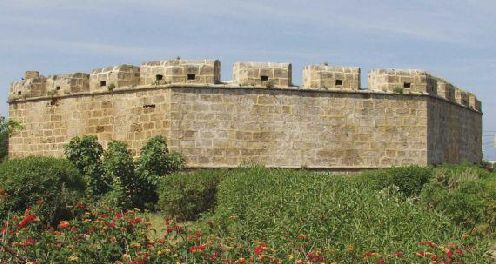
Bordj Tamentfoust

When the Troupes coloniales of the French Navy landed at Sidi Fredj in 1830 to take the Casbah of Algiers, the Sufi murids all around the Mitidja mobilized to counter the offensive of the French Armed Forces which was heading towards the capital from the Algerian country.

The talibes of Zawiyet Sidi Boumerdassi rallied the Kabyle contingents who then rushed to face the collapse of national sovereignty before the colonial invaders.

The Sufi Sheikh who then presided over this zawiya was the marabout Hammou ben Abdelkrim al-Boumerdassi, the father of Cheikh Boumerdassi, who attended in the Bordj Tamentfoust at the meeting of the spiritual leaders of the Algerian zawiyas under the presidency of Sheikh Mohamed ben Zamoum, and this just after the fall of Algiers and the surrender of Hussein Dey.

This is how this zawiya took part in giving the Algerians a popular collegial direction through Allegiance to Mohamed ben Zamoum by the murids of the outskirts of the Algérois region.

Popular resistance against the French military occupation of Mitidja and Kabylia would then begin under the patronage of the Sheikhs of the Zawiyas, including Hammou ben Abdelkrim al-Boumerdassi.

=== French conquest ===
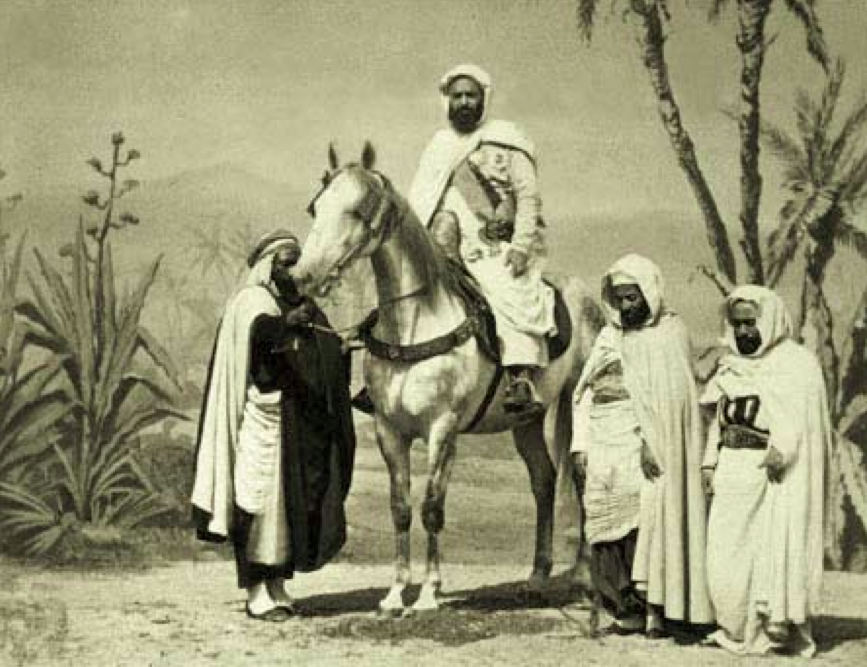
Emir Abdelkader in Kabylia.

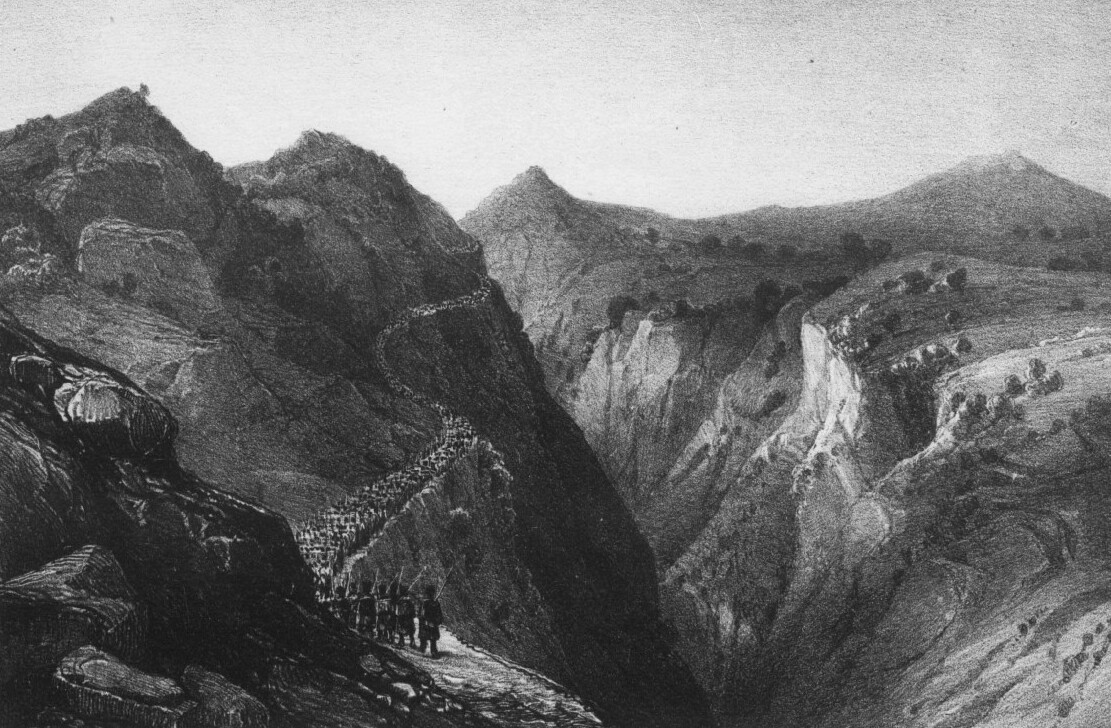
Meraldene ravine

As soon as the French landed in Algiers, the colonization strategy began in 1830 in order to populate the country with French people while excluding the Algerians from their wealth and their land.

But this stratagem could not go beyond the course of Oued Boudouaou towards Kabylia until after the Emir Abdelkader installed his power in the region of Zawiyet Sidi Boumerdassi in 1837 and began to attack the farms of settler farmers in Réghaïa.

The first French officer who dared to attack and scout the Beni Aïcha region around the zawiya is Colonel Maximilien Joseph Schauenburg who arrived in the night of 18 May 1837 at the Meraldene ravine with his troops, as part of the Expedition of the Col des Beni Aïcha.

Thus, from the spring of 1837, the process of French pacification of the corners of Kabylia around the mountains of Khachna and beyond was to continue crescendo until 1857 when the Algerians stopped attacking the French after the capture of Larbaâ Nath Irathen.

=== Colonization ===
From 1857, the colonization of Algerian lands beyond Oued Boudouaou began with ardor, and French farmers began to settle in bivouacs on the sides of the mountains that shelter the zawiya around Ouled Boumerdès.

The buds of settlements began to emerge in Boudouaou, Corso, Tidjelabine, Thénia, Souk El Haad, Beni Amrane and Lakhdaria, and the zawiya saw the noose tighten on living space and the villages in its obedience.

Even if the religious and tribal influence of the zawiya marabouts remained intact, the economic attractiveness of agricultural and mercantile techniques and the salaries of the new arrivals began to pose a problem for the cohesion of the villages affiliated to the zawiya.

The Rahmaniyya brotherhood persisted in maintaining through Zawiyet Sidi Boumerdassi a social network which warned the Khachna region against French hegemony, but the pressure was going to be in force and intensity to shake up a secular social order and which would not be long in lifting its shields against the military, demographic and cultural invasion of the French.

== Notable people ==
- Cheikh Boumerdassi (1818-1874)
- Mohamed Seghir Boushaki (1869-1959)
- Mohamed Boumerdassi (1936-2010)
- Yahia Boushaki (1935-1960)
- Ali Boushaki (1855-1965)
- Abderrahmane Boushaki (1896-1985)
- Brahim Boushaki (1912-1997)
- Abdelkader Boumerdassi (born 1837)
- Hammou Boumerdassi (born 1793)

== See also ==
- Algerian Islamic reference
- Zawiyas in Algeria
- Qadiriyya
- Rahmaniyya
- Ouled Boumerdès
- Cheikh Boumerdassi
- Mokrani Revolt
- Battle of the Col des Beni Aïcha
- Battle of Alma (Algeria)
- Dar Es-Soltane
- East Beylik
- Oued Boudouaou
- Maximilien Joseph Schauenburg
- Raid on Reghaïa (1837)
- Expedition of the Col des Beni Aïcha
- First Battle of Boudouaou
