= French ship Prince Jérôme =

Ship of the line of the French Navy

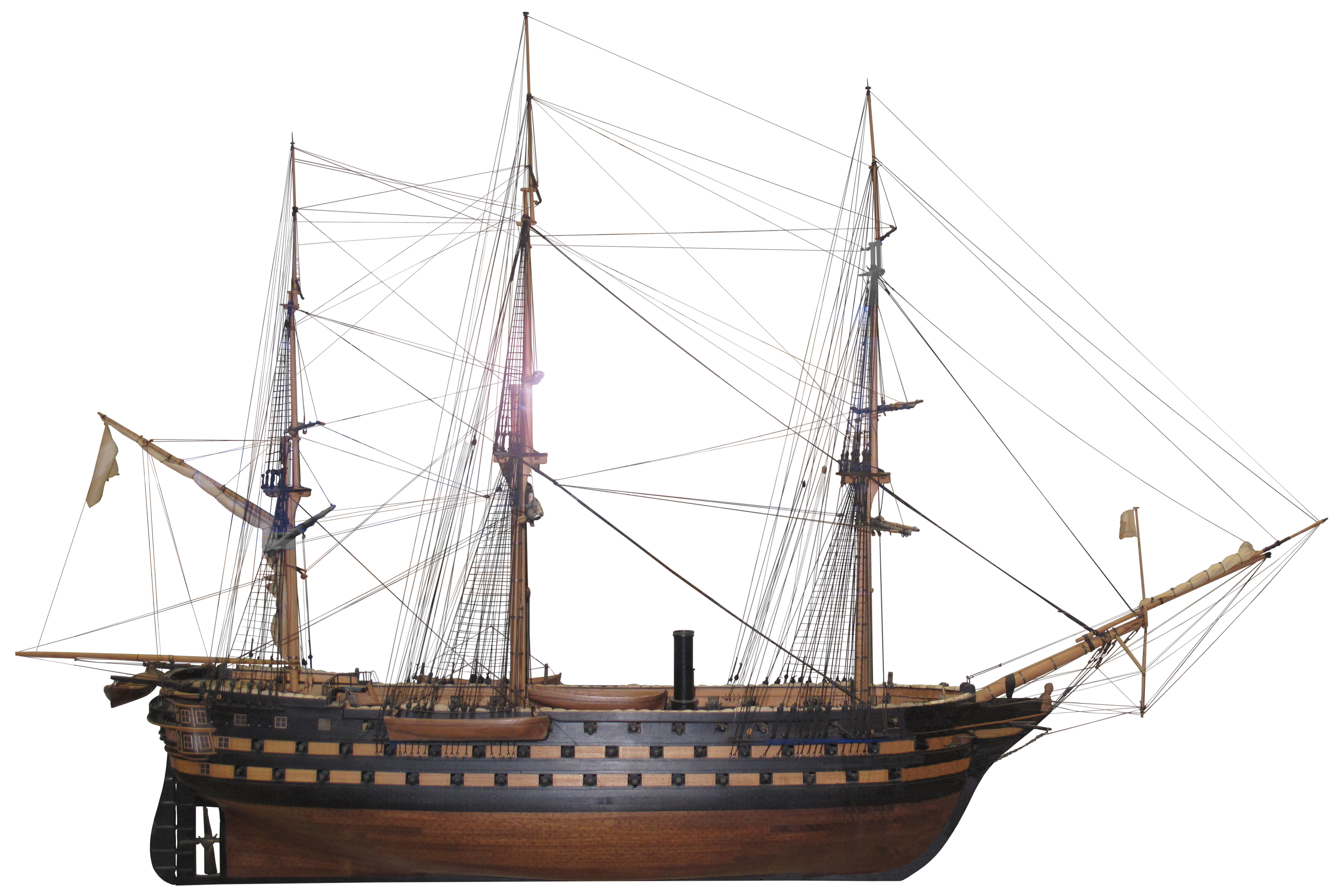
- 1/75th-scale model of Prince Jérôme, on display at the Swiss Museum of Transport.

History

France
- Name: Annibal (1827); Prince Jérôme (1854); Hoche (1870); Loire (1872)
- Namesake: Hannibal; Jérôme Bonaparte; Lazare Hoche; Loire
- Launched: 2 December 1853
- Fate: Scrapped 1885

General characteristics
- Class & type: Hercule class
- Displacement: 4440 tonnes
- Length: 62.50
- Beam: 16.20
- Draught: 8.23
- Sail plan: 3150 m² of sails
- Complement: 955 men
- Armament: 100 guns, including: 32 × 30-pounder long guns (lower deck); 30 × 30-pounder short guns (upper deck); 30 30-pounder carronades (open deck); 4 × 18-pounder long guns (open deck)
- Armour: timber

Prince Jérôme was a late ship of the line of the French Navy. Started in 1827 as the Hercule-class Hannibal, she was abandoned for nearly thirty years before being completed under the Second French Empire as a steam-powered ship of the line, under the name Prince Jérôme. Obsolete at the rise of the French Third Republic, she was renamed Hoche and struck shortly after. She was recommissioned in 1872 as a transport under the name Loire, and ended her career in 1885 as a hulk in Saigon.

== Service history ==
On 28 July 1856, the British steamship Italian put into Lisbon, Portugal on fire and was beached. The fire was extinguished with assistance from land based fire engines and Prince Jérôme.

== La Loire (1872) ==
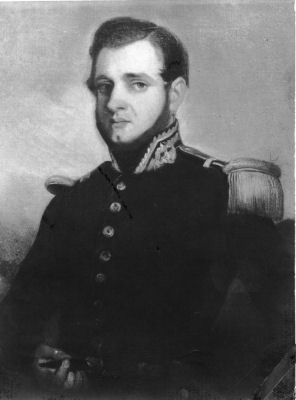
Adolphe Lucien Mottez (1822-1892)

On 6 June 1872, this ship was struck off the lists of the French fleet for the first time.

But his transport career will rebound again since the Bagne of Toulon has become congested, and the French Government wanted to increase the deportations of convicts and prisoners to overcome the problem of exiguity, which required resorting to means of great exile capacities towards the islands of the Pacific.

A project is then submitted for the transformation of the ship for use in sailing transport in order to be able to embark 800 condemned men, 200 free passengers and 400 crew.

The project was approved on 27 September 1872 and the transformation work began in October, and the ship was again re-entered on the Fleet's lists as a sailboat.

It was then renamed La Loire from the start of the transformation works, and in November and December a new transformation takes place, with the unloading of the artillery and the machine, the replacement of the old mast by a more rig. light, the installation of the new artillery and its ammunition, the enlargement of the poop.

The construction of a teugue is then carried out, which is a low superstructure, then by extension raising at the front of a boat, and this at the front of the boat to accommodate part of the crew.

There is also an installation of side cylinders outside the hull, in the high battery, and a setting up of a station at the front for the rest of the crew, with the construction of prisons for around 350 inmates with an infirmary. separating them, and fitting out of the false-deck to accommodate free passengers.

Food forecasts have been taken into consideration to meet the needs of the crew and passengers for 10 months, and for 5 months for the convicts.

The transformation work ended on 20 February 1873, and the ship was fitted out on 1 March and placed under the orders of Captain Jacques, known as Lapierre.

From January to March 1874, the ship was transformed again in order to reduce the capacity for convicts in favor of that of free passengers.

=== 9th convoy of deportees ===
In April La Loire was rearmed and placed under the orders of the captain of the vessel Adolphe Lucien Mottez (1822-1892), and on 18 May, he was at the port of Brest where he embarked 280 convicts and 50 Algerian deportees at Fort Quélern from the Mokrani Revolt, at their head the marabout Cheikh Boumerdassi, then set off.

This ship arrived on 7 June at the anchorage of the harbor of Île-d'Aix, where it embarked 700 passengers, including 40 women, and 320 French deportees.

On 9 June, it left for Nouméa, and it was thus the 9th convoy of deportees that left France to then stop on 23 June in Santa Cruz de Tenerife, to arrive in Nouméa on 16 October 1874.

There will be around 5 deaths at sea, and on 10 November of the same year, he left Nouméa to return to France.

== See also ==
- French ship Loire
- Fort Quélern
- Mokrani Revolt
- Algerians of the Pacific
