= Cheikh Boumerdassi =

Algerian nationalist (1818–1874)

Cheikh Mohamed El-Boumerdassi _{Mohamed ben Hamou}
- Born: Muḥ U Ḥemu U Ɛebdelkrim Lbumerdasi; 1818; Ouled Boumerdès, Algeria
- Died: 1874 (aged 55–56); New Caledonia
- Occupations: Sheikh, Marabout
- Known for: Zawiyet Sidi Boumerdassi, Mokrani Revolt
- Notable work: Battle of the Col des Beni Aïcha; Battle of Alma (Algeria)

Cheikh Mohamed El-Boumerdassi (Kabyle: Muḥend Lbumerdasi, Arabic: الشيخ محمد البومرداسي) was one of the principal leaders of the popular Mokrani Revolt uprising of 1871 against the French occupation of Algeria.

== Early life ==
Mohamed ben Hamou ben Abdelkrim El-Boumerdassi was a descendant of the marabout Sidi Ali Boumerdassi who founded the Zawiyet Sidi Boumerdassi.

He was born around 1818, and was the oldest of five brothers, whose father Hamou ben Abdelkrim (Arabic: حمو بن عبد الكريم) was a renowned and respected Sufi marabout in Kabylia, and his mother was Zehira bent Mohamed ben Amar (Arabic: زهيرة بنت محمد بن عمار).

As described by the French as adults like his younger brothers, he presented a sober build and a height exceeding 1.6 m, with graying black hair and eyebrows, a receding wrinkled forehead and chestnut eyes with a long slender nose and a big mouth, a round chin on an oval face, a swarthy complexion and he was a little bald.

== Mokrani Revolt ==
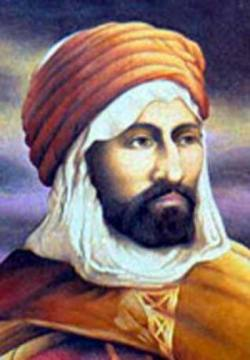
Cheikh Mokrani

During the spring of 1871, the Algerians rose up against the French invaders who had decided to build settlements for farmers brought back from Alsace-Lorraine after the French defeat of 18 January 1871 by the Germans, in the Franco-Prussian War, and the annexation of this French region which forced the French-speaking populations to leave their lands.

Thus in March 1871, the Algerians saw Alsatian farmers disembark on their ancestral lands after the territories, corresponding to the current departments of Bas-Rhin, Haut-Rhin and Moselle, were integrated into the German Empire.

The rural populations of the east of the city of Algiers then gathered around the marabouts of the Rahmaniyya brotherhood to find a solution to this imminent demographic invasion and to counter the specter of the theft of their arable land in order to offer them to the new colonizers arriving from France.

Cheikh Boumerdassi, then 48 years old, then joined with the murids and saliks of the Zawiyet Sidi Ali Boumerdassi to the popular guerrilla troops from the uprising of 16 March 1871 and which would reach the valley of the Oued Isser from half of April 1871.

== Imprisonment ==
While several of the leaders of the insurgency were assassinated by French soldiers, Cheikh Boumerdassi and some marabouts were captured and imprisoned.

After the end of the hostilities of the insurrection of Cheikh Mokrani, Cheikh Boumerdassi as well as several Algerian rebel leaders captured alive appeared before the assize court of Algiers from 27 December 1872 on one count and one indictment linked to the dismissal of the French colonies, the assassinations, fires and looting which sparked heated debates on this extremely important case.

Several criminal charges weighed on each of the accused who had all, without exception, participated in the insurrection, and the prosecution brought charges against each of the accused, including Cheikh Boumerdassi, for the crimes alleged against these main leaders and leaders of the uprising of 1871.

His brother Abdelkader Boumerdassi was put by the first one of the Bureaux arabes under the qualifier wanted and watched, after being declared rebellious, even after his release and his return to his work as a farmer.

== Deportation to Caledonia ==
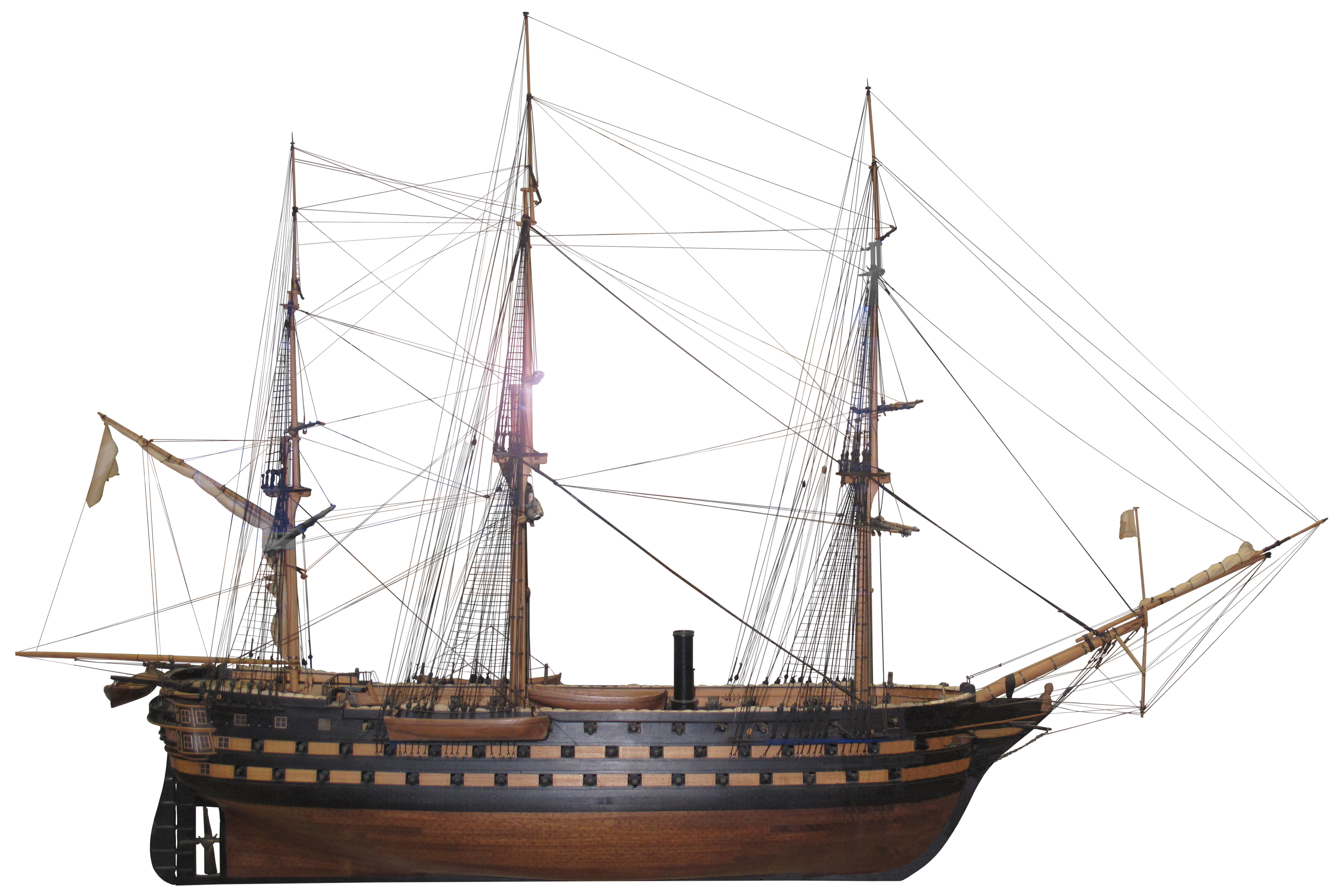
1/75th-scale model of Prince Jérôme alias La Loire, on display at the Swiss Museum of Transport.

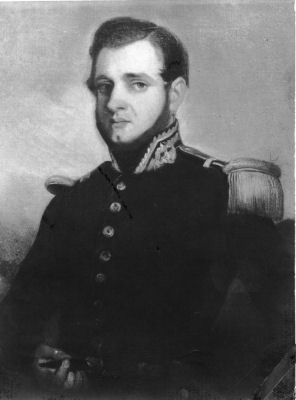
Adolphe Lucien Mottez (1822–1892)

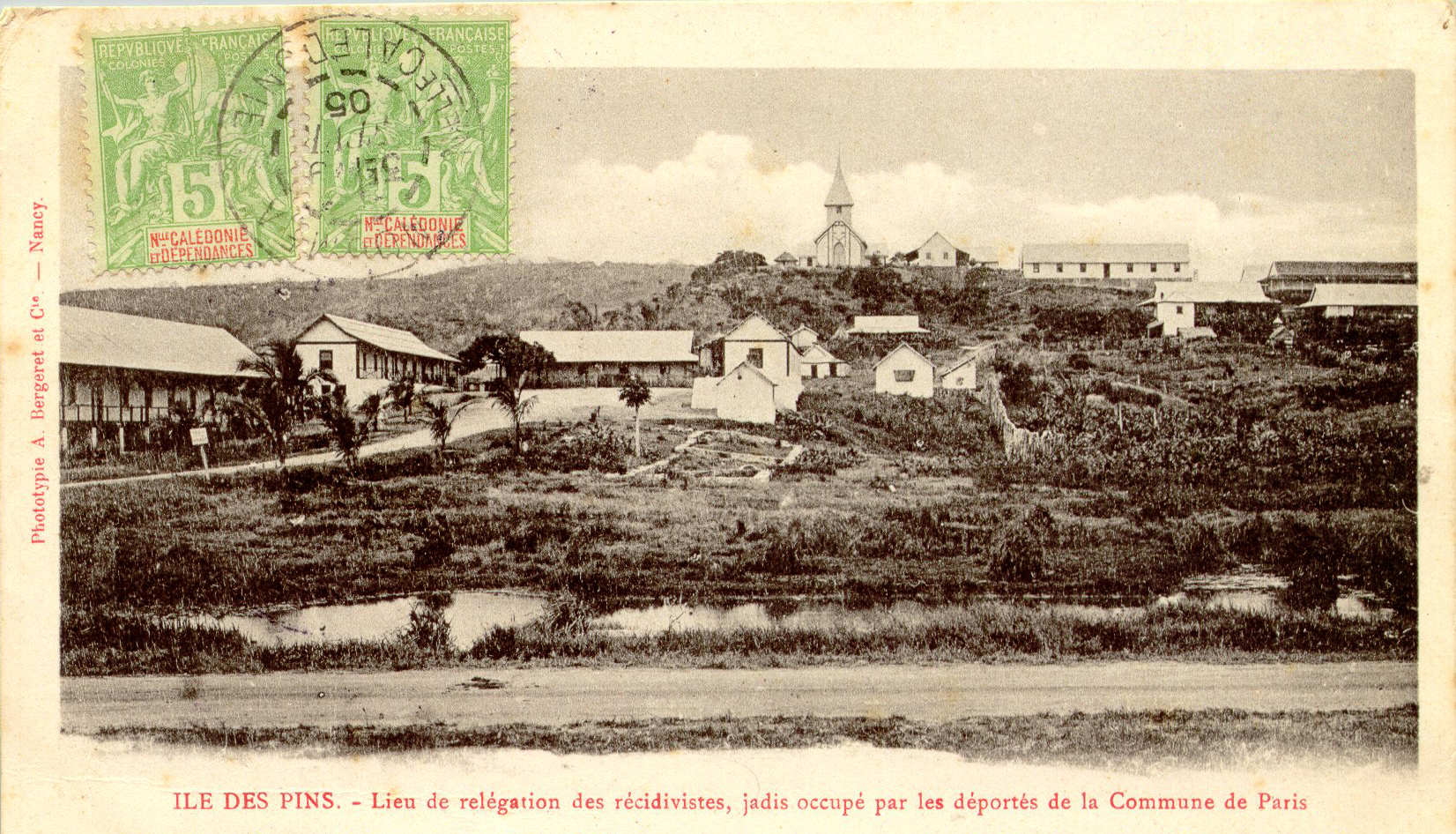
Prison on the L'Île-des-Pins

After the complete stifling of the insurrection of Cheikh Mokrani, the orders of sequestration of the lands of the Kabyle insurgents were promulgated.

If some Kabyle insurgents were then sentenced to death or hard labor for life, Cheikh Boumerdassi and other rebels were simply deported to New Caledonia.

The Cheikh after having been taken prisoner at Fort Quélern, then was transported by the ship "La Loire", and on board thirty-four Algerian political deportees via the ninth convoy which left on 5 June 1874 from the port of Brest and arrived at the port of Nouméa on 16 October 1874.

The native prisoners of the Col des Beni Aïcha and of Kabylie were registered under serial numbers before their embarkation towards New Caledonia.

The deportee Cheikh Boumerdassi, aged 56 at the time, obtained the Order number: 1301 during his last trip which lasted 129 days from the Île-d'Aix.

It is the research of the scientist "Melica Ouennoughi" which made it possible to reveal the place of the deportation of "Cheikh Boumerdassi" during the genealogical establishment of the first lists of the movements of Maghrebis condemned to the Caledonian prison from 1867 until 1895.

Cheikh Boumerdassi had thus embarked on 5 June 1874, under the orders of the frigate captain Adolphe Lucien Mottez (1822–1892), on the ship La Loire which left Brest, and the Cheikh was condemned to a simple deportation.

This boat had embarked 40 convicts, 39 of which were intended for simple deportation to L'Île-des-Pins, and only one of them for deportation to a fortified enclosure.

During the crossing, five Algerians died, and out of the 300 convoys in the convoy, 250 suffered from scurvy and died in the weeks following their arrival in New Caledonia according to Roger Pérennès.

== Land grabbing ==
After the Mokrani Revolt was defeated from May 1871 by General Orphis Léon Lallemand and Captain Alexandre Fourchault, and that Cheikh Boumerdassi was captured, imprisoned and deported, the land of his family and his brothers was plundered by the French colonial administration.

It was dated 20 November 1874 that an order of Antoine Chanzy, the French governor of Algeria, imposed collective and nominative sequestration on all the land owned by Ouled Boumerdès and Draâ Ben Hadhoum in the commune of the Col des Beni Aïcha, part of which belonged undividedly with others to the five brothers Ben Hamou ben Ali Boumerdassi: Mohamed (Cheikh Boumerdassi), Abdelkrim, Bouzid, Ahmed and Abdelkader (born 1837).

The application of this decree of spoliation of the land of the family of Cheikh Boumerdassi, the Ben Hamou ben Ali brothers, was supported by the administration of the domains which took possession of it and published its consistency, the content and the designation on 22 May 1877 after the said administration had rented these goods for several years, then put them up for public tender on 2 December 1879 with other lands also sequestered at the town hall of Ménerville.

Spread over fourteen lots, all the plundered land reached 14 hectares and 24 ares including arable grain land, two houses, a gourbi and a cultivated land with fig trees.

== See also ==
- Zawiyet Sidi Boumerdassi
- Mokrani Revolt
- Battle of the Col des Beni Aïcha
- Battle of Alma (Algeria)
- Algerians of the Pacific
- Fort Quélern
- French ship Loire (1827)

== Bibliography ==
- (fr) Un Épisode de l’insurrection Kabyle. — L’Alma, Palestro
