= Cheikh El Haddad =

Muhend Amezyan Ahaddad
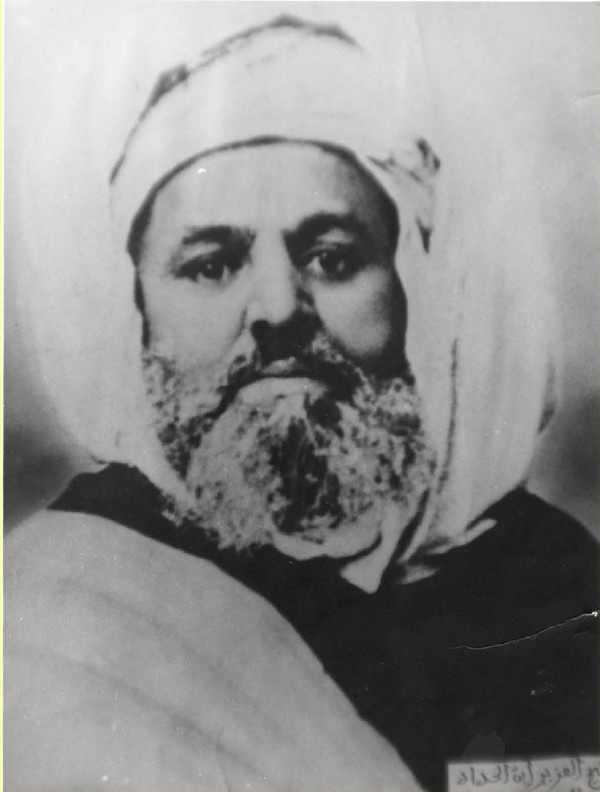
- Aziz, son of Cheikh El Haddad
- Native name: ⵎⵓⵀⵏⴷ ⴰⵎⵣⵢⴰⵏ ⴰⵀⴰⴷⴷⴰⴷ
- Nickname: Cheikh El Haddad
- Born: 30 November 1790; Seddouk
- Died: 29 April 1873 (aged 82) Constantine, Algeria
- Allegiance: Kingdom of Ait Abbas
- Service years: 1871
- Known for: Commander in the Mokrani Revolt
- Conflicts: Mokrani Revolt (surrendered)
- Children: 2

Muhand Amezyan Aheddad (30 November 1790, Seddouk - 29 April 1873, Constantine), also known as Cheikh El Haddad, was a prominent leader in the 1871 uprising in Algeria. He collaborated closely with Cheikh El Mokrani and Boumezrag Ait Mokran during this period.

== Personal life ==
The family of Cheikh El Haddad relocated from the Ait Mansour tribe (now in the commune of Akfadou) to settle in Ighil Imoula, situated in the Soummam Valley, and subsequently in Seddouk.

The surname "El Haddad" originated from his grandfather, who was a blacksmith. His father, Abi Ali Al-Haddad, established the zawiya of Seddouk, where Muhand Amezyan received instruction in linguistic and religious studies. Later, he continued his education in Islamic theology under the guidance of several esteemed scholars.

Cheikh El Haddad underwent initial training under Cheikh Al-Rabia Benmouhoub in Ighil Imoula, followed by further education with Cheikh Arab Nath Irathen in Kabylie. He pursued additional studies at the zawiya of Bounouh in Aït-Smail, established by the founder of the Rahmaniyya, Sidi M'hamed Bou Qobrine. Subsequently, he assumed a teaching role at his father's zawiya in Seddouk and authored several works, including one titled "Al-Taqyid al-Mubarek," focusing on Sufism.

In 1860, Cheikh El Haddad assumed leadership of the Rahmaniyya Sufi order in Kabylia, operating from his village of Seddouk-Ouffella, In light of his increasing popularity, the colonial administration expressed concern and subjected both him and his disciples (moqaddim) to close surveillance.

== Writing ==
El Haddad authored several works, including a Sufi treatise titled al-Taqyid al-Mubarek. The manuscript comprises 84 folios and was copied in 1876. It was discovered at the Rafsa Zawiyya in Sétif. This zawiyya was established by Cheikh El-Hacène Boucenna, a senior figure in the al-Rahmaniyya Tariqa, succeeding Cheikh El-Houès. Amar Talbi first highlighted this work in 1971, based on the manuscript of M.C. Bencheikh.

The 1845 manuscript on Sufism by Cheikh Bouabdelli provides insight into the social conditions of Haddad's life:

Innovations, Bid'a, have pervaded the world. No city, no village is exempt. I have personally observed this. Tradition, Sunna, has yielded to worldly passions. The people of orthodoxy face increasing humiliation. As for the innovators, they are the ones occupying positions of responsibility in administration, justice, and beyond

— Cheikh El Haddad, 1845,

== Political life ==
During the 1871 uprising led by Mokrani, Cheikh Aziz and Cheikh M'hand, El Haddad's sons joined the rebels, leading the fight on behalf of their father, who, due to his age, could not actively participate. On 8 April 1871, at the age of 80, El Haddad called for rebellion during a gathering at the market of Seddouk. His appeal for resistance against the French colonizers had a profound impact, as more than 250 tribes, totaling over 10,000 fighters, responded. The rallying cry became famous throughout Algeria.

We will cast the French into the sea, just as I throw this stick to the ground.

— Cheikh El Haddad, 8 April 1871

The resistance called for by El Haddad encompassed a significant portion of Algeria, stretching from Algiers in the east to Batna in the north. However, this widespread resistance proved insufficient to overcome the French army, which ultimately emerged victorious. In addition to the considerable casualties during the conflicts, a harsh repression ensued. Tribes were compelled to pay a war contribution, often burdening the most impoverished, and their lands were seized.

Following the defeat, El Haddad was arrested on July 13, 1871. On April 19, 1873, he was sentenced to five years in prison by the Assize Court of Constantine. He died in custody on April 29, 1873, only 10 days after being sentenced, at the age of 83. His two sons, Aziz and M'hand, were deported to New Caledonia.
