= Boumerdès (disambiguation) =

Boumerdès is a town in Algeria.

Boumerdès may also refer to:

- Boumerdès District, Algeria
- Boumerdès Province, Algeria
- RC Boumerdes, an Algerian football club

== See also ==
- Boumerdassi (disambiguation)
- Ouled Boumerdès, a village in Algeria
- List of people from Boumerdès Province
- 2003 Boumerdès earthquake
