= Samri =

Folkloric music and dance native to Persian Gulf

Samri (Arabic: سامري) is a folkloric music and dance that originated in Najd, Saudi Arabia. It involves singing poetry while the Daf drum is being played often while two rows of men, seated on the knees, sway and clap to the rhythm. Roughly 300 years old, samri is a style of festive music that was traditionally played late at night when families gathered around; the women's style of samri is a bit slower with more dancing.
