= Mohamed Boumerdassi =

Sheikh Mohamed Boumerdassi الشيخ محمد بومرداسي
- Born: Mohamed ben Mustapha al-Boumerdassi; March 18, 1936; Ouled Boumerdès, Algeria
- Origin: Berber people
- Died: December 7, 2010 (aged 74) Thénia, Algeria
- Genres: Bedouin music, Malhun
- Occupations: musician, singer
- Instruments: flute, daf

Mohamed Boumerdassi (Arabic: محمد بومرداسي), (March 18, 1936, in Ouled Boumerdès – December 7, 2010, in Thénia) was considered a Grand Master of Bedouin music, Malhun and Algerian music.

== Life ==
He was born on March 18, 1936, under the name Mohamed ben Mustapha al-Boumerdassi in the Ouled Boumerdès village within the actual Boumerdès Province.

He received his basic education at the Zawiyet Sidi Boumerdassi in his native village of Ouled Boumerdès, where he learned the Quran.

He was a keen admirer of Sheikh Ben Ahmed al-Boumerdassi, then known for his qasida of madih nabawi and poetry praising Muhammad.

He was also a follower of Sheikh al-Miliani, who appointed him Commander of Bedouin Song (machiakha) after discovering his voice which he greatly admired.

He was notably renowned for his song Hammam Alouane and a tribute was paid to him in 2004 by the Algerian Minister of Culture for the "National festival of Bedouin song and popular poetry".

He died on Tuesday evening, December 7, 2010, at the age of 74 years at his home located on the Yahia Boushaki Boulevard in Thénia and was buried the next day in the Bourouiche cemetery north of the same city.

A large audience represented by the friends of the deceased, his family and representatives of the Ministry of Culture and the authorities of the Boumerdès Province, accompanied Sheikh al-Boumerdassi to his last home.

== Songs ==
- Hammam Alouane

== See also ==
- List of Algerian musicians
- Bedouin music
- Malhun
- Music of Algeria
- Culture of Algeria
- Zawiyet Sidi Boumerdassi
