= Rachid Mimouni =

Algerian writer

- Born: 20 November 1945 Boudouaou, Algeria
- Died: 12 February 1995 (aged 49) Paris, France
- Occupation: Writer

Rachid Mimouni (Kabyle: Racid Mimuni, Arabic: رشيد ميموني; 20 November 1945 – 12 February 1995) was an Algerian writer, teacher, and human rights activist.

Mimouni wrote novels describing Algerian society in a realist style. He was threatened by Islamic militants for his stance against a movement which he described as being based on archaic ideas, irrelevant in the present time.

== Biography ==
Rachid Mimouni was born in Boudouaou, 30 km from Algiers to a family of poor peasants.

Mimouni studied science at the University of Algiers before becoming a teacher at the École supérieure du commerce (business school) in Algiers. He was president of the Kateb Yacine foundation and also held the position of vice-president at Amnesty International. He fled Algeria for France in 1993 to escape the civil war and the assassinations of intellectuals. He died in Paris in 1995 of hepatitis. Prior to his death, he had been "living in Morocco for the past two years".

== Works ==
- « Le printemps n'en sera que plus beau » (1978)
- « Le Fleuve détourné » (1982)
- « Une peine à vivre » (1983)
- « Tombéza » (1984)
- « L'Honneur de la tribu » (1989)
- « La ceinture de l'ogresse » (1990)
- « Une paix à vivre » (1991)
- « De la barbarie en général et de l'intégrisme en particulier » (1992)
- « La Malédiction » (1993)
- « Chroniques de Tanger » (1995)
- « Une peine à vivre »(1983)

== Literary Awards ==
- Prix de l'Amitié Franco-Arabe (Fraco-Arab Friendship Award) for « L'honneur de la tribu » (1990)
- Prix de la critique littéraire : Ruban de la francophonie (Literary Critics Award, best Francophone novel) for « L'honneur de la tribu » (1990)
- Prix de littérature-cinéma du festival international du film à Cannes (Cannes Film Festival Film-Literature Award) for « L'honneur de la tribu » (1990)
- Prix de l'Académie française (Académie française Award) for « La ceinture de l'ogresse » (1991)
- Prix Hassan II des Quatre Jurys (Hassan II Four Juries Award ) for his complete works (1992)
- Prix Albert Camus (Albert Camus Award) for « Une peine à vivre et De la barbarie en général et de l’intégrisme en particulier » (1993)
- Prix du Levant (Levant Award) for « La malédiction » (1993)
- Prix Liberté Littéraire (Literary Freedom Award) for « La malédiction » (1994)
- Prix spécial Grand Atlas (Special Grand Atlas Award) for his complete works (1995)
