= Fort Quélern =

- Roscanvel in France
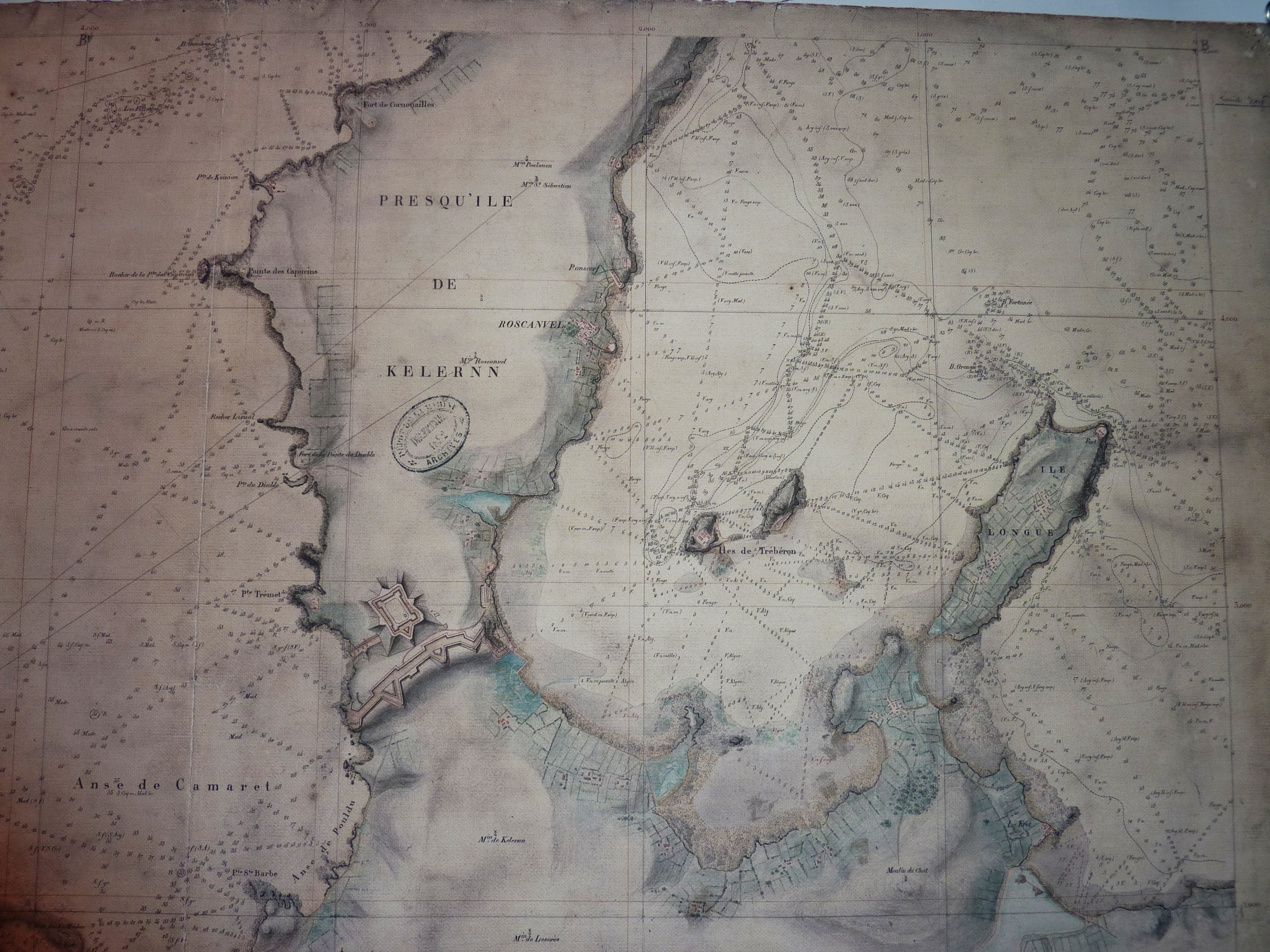
- Location map of Fort Quélern

Site information
- Type: Castle, Prison, Barracks
- Owner: Ministry of Armed Forces in France
- Operator: Direction générale de la Sécurité extérieure
- Controlled by: Action Division

Location
- Coordinates: 48.2987455°N 4.5641553°W

Site history
- Built: 1852
- In use: 1854

Garrison information
- Occupants: Communards, Mokrani Revolt

The fort Quélern or réduit de Quélern is a castle and prison in the commune of Roscanvel in France.

== Construction ==
This fort was built between 1852 and 1854 on modified plans by Sébastien Le Prestre de Vauban (1633–1707).

It is an enclosure in the form of a square fort, bastioned and surrounded by a dug ditch.

The redoubt was built between 1852 and 1854 behind the Quélern lines, at the tightest point of the Roscanvel peninsula, in order to protect the peninsula's works from rear attacks.

A fort project had already been issued by Vauban at the end of the 17th century, but it had not been built with the exception of the southern front integrated into the defensive system of the Quélern lines.

After the war of 1870, an underground powder magazine type 1874 was built there and since destroyed.

== Description ==
It is a strong rectangle 230 m long by 170 m wide, surrounded by a ditch 7 m wide on average dug into the rock.

The scarp is semi-detached on the western, northern and eastern fronts and tied on the southern front.

== Prison ==
In 1871, Fort Quélern was divided into two parts, the northern part was a closed area for prisoners living in barracks originally intended for soldiers.

In the center of these chambers were the administrative rooms, the accommodation of the director, the guards, while the southern part has been preserved for military use.

Several hundred Communards, including the geographer Élisée Reclus (1830 –1905) and the politician Jean Allemane (1843-1935), were condemned to serve their sentence in the Fort Quélern, from April 1871 to March 1875.

Kabyle insurgents from the events of Mokrani Revolt in 1871 in Algeria were also imprisoned in this fort, including the marabout Cheikh Boumerdassi (1818-1874) and Boumezrag Ait Mokran (death 1906).

Before the prison closed, 124 Algerian prisoners passed through Fort Quélern where 6 died there, including Mohamed ben Fialah.

The latter rest in a cemetery not far away in the harbor of Brest among the Communards on the Île des Morts.

== Garrison ==
Even if it served as a prison, the Fort Quélern was above all intended to further strengthen the protection of the isthmus of the Roscanvel peninsula.

== Gallery ==
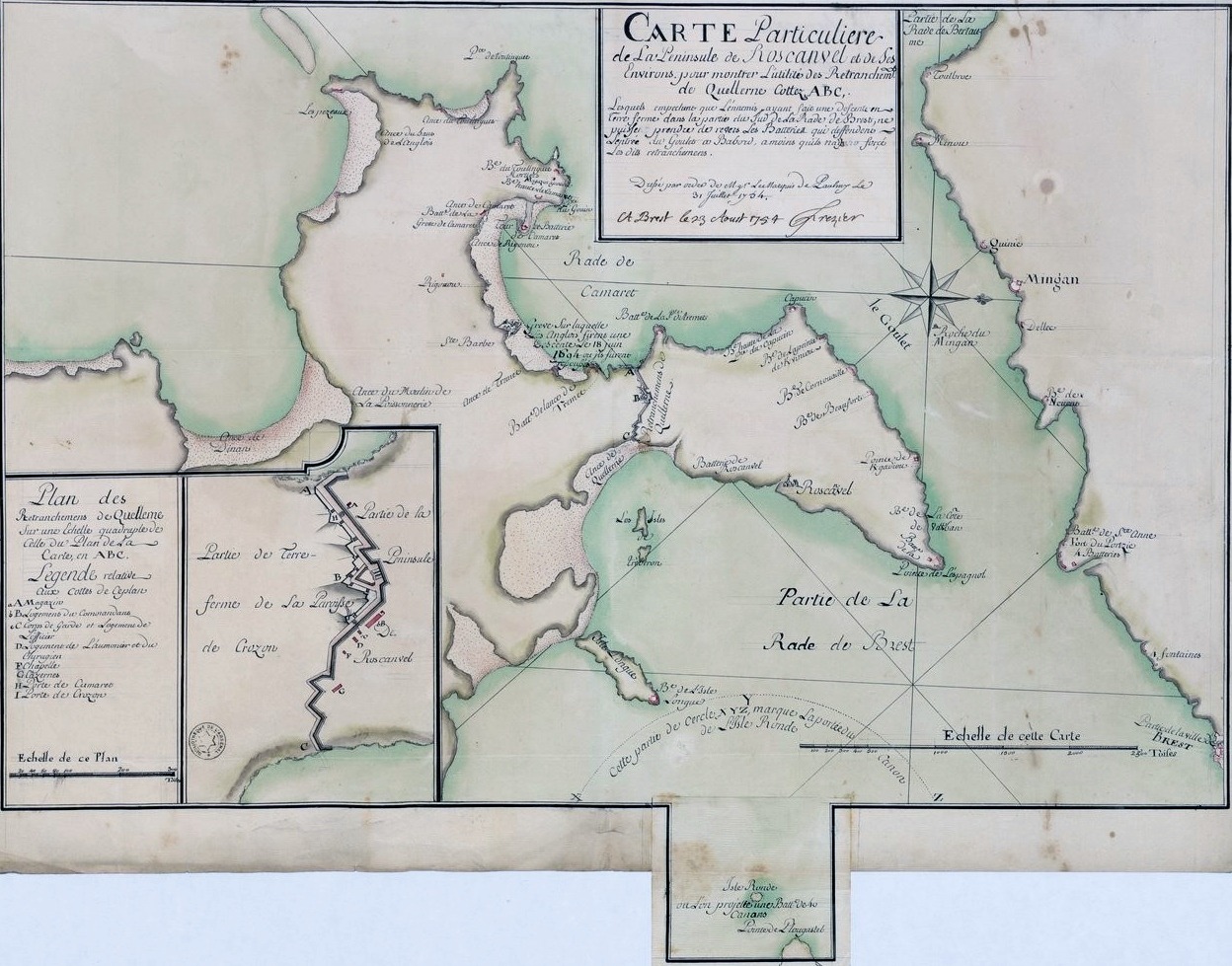
Location map of Fort Quélern

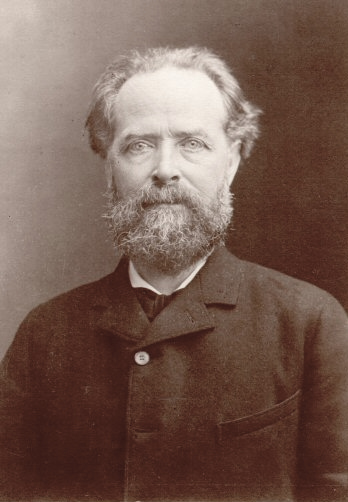
Élisée Reclus (1830 –1905)

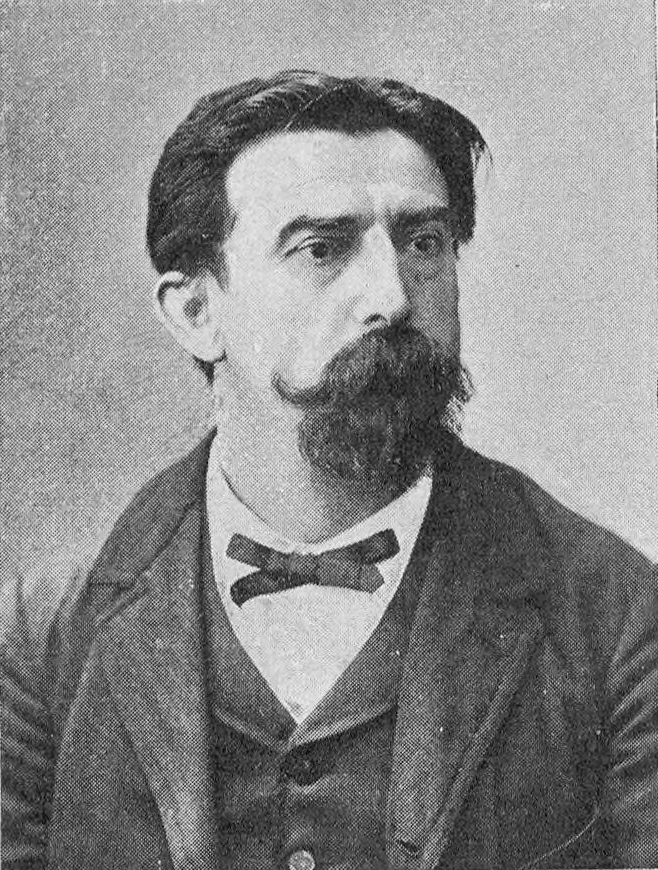
Jean Allemane (1843-1935)

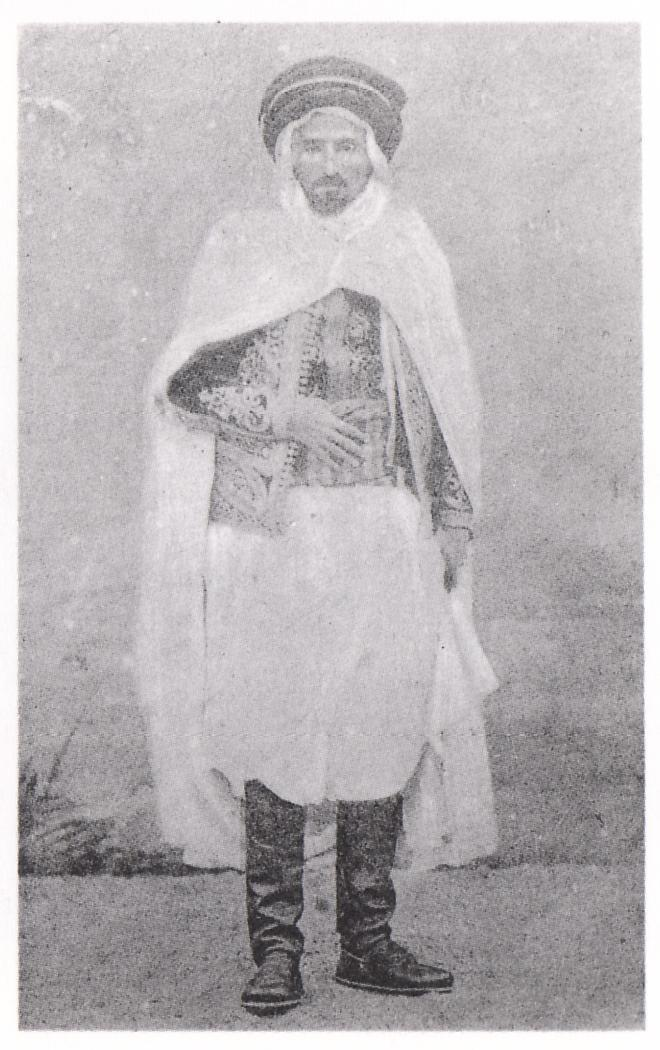
Boumezrag Ait Mokran (death 1906)

== See also ==
- Sébastien Le Prestre de Vauban
- Mokrani Revolt
- Cheikh Boumerdassi
- Boumezrag Ait Mokran
