= Battle of Alma (Algeria) =

- Part of the Mokrani Revolt
Date	19-22 April 1871
Location	Boudouaou 36.7261264°N 3.4114237°E
Result	French victory

Belligerents
Kingdom of Ait Abbas; Islamic Zawiyas; Rahmaniyya	France

Commanders and leaders
Cheikh Mokrani; Cheikh Boumerdassi; Cheikh Boushaki; Cheikh Zamoum	(France) Louis Henri (France) Alexandre Fourchault (France) General Lallemand

Strength
2,000 warriors	2,300 infantrymen

The Battle of Alma or Battle of Boudouaou, which broke out on 19 April 1871, was a battle of the Mokrani Revolt by Algerian rebels against France, which had been the colonial power in the region since 1830.

== Presentation ==
The rebels of the Mokrani Revolt, after several successes, headed for Algiers via Alma (Boudouaou) after having taken control of Palestro (Lakhdaria), Laazib Zamoum (Naciria), Bordj Menaïel, the Issers and the Col des Beni Aïcha (Thenia).

It was the Marabout Cheikh Boumerdassi, Cheikh of the Zawiyet Sidi Boumerdassi, and Marabout Cheikh Boushaki, Cheikh of the Zawiyet Sidi Boushaki, who led this Algerian attack against the French colonies in Lower Kabylia.

Advancing from Palestro towards Algiers, the fighters were stopped at Boudouaou (Alma) on 22 April 1871.

The Algerian rebels then made a fatal error in their advance towards Algiers, by igniting a fire in the woods around Reghaïa which alerted the French garrison.

== French counter-attack ==
The Governor General of Algiers, Louis Henri de Gueydon, decided to retake the colony of Alma by sending on April 21, 1871, an expeditionary unit tasked with stopping the march of the Algerian masses who were threatening the Mitidja.

The unit consisted of 2,300 infantrymen made up of Zouaves, Algerian riflemen, militiamen from Algiers, mobiles from Hérault, over 200 Chasseurs d'Afrique, a few spahis and 4 mounted howitzers.

This unit moved towards the village of Alma, located 37 kilometers from Algiers, and sighted the first Algerian rebels the day before, April 20.

It was Colonel Alexandre Fourchault who took charge of the counter-attack of the Troupes coloniales, to push back the Algerians who were going to overtake Boudouaou to begin the conquest of Mitidja.

The Algerian rebels trying to invade Mitidja were only stopped in Alma by the French-Algerian unit, and Colonel Fourchault's snipers.

Colonel Fourchault and his snipers, after having stopped the Algerian insurrection in Alma on April 22, 1871, then marched on the Col des Beni Aïcha to dislodge the Algerian resistance fighters and punish the Kabyle population who supported them, before clearing and freeing Palestro and discovering the massacre of European settlers by supporters of Cheikh Mokrani.

== See also ==
- Zawiyet Sidi Boumerdassi
- Zawiyet Sidi Boushaki
- Cheikh Boumerdassi

== Bibliography ==
- (fr) Un Épisode de l’insurrection Kabyle. — L’Alma, Palestro
