= Alexandre Fourchault =

French officer

- Born: Alexandre Édouard Constant Fourchault; 19 August 1817; Orléans, France
- Died: 10 April 1884 (aged 66); Algiers, Algeria
- Spouse: Émeline-Éliza-Joséphine-Marie D'Ercourt
- Military career
- Allegiance: France
- Branch: French Army
- Service years: 1840–1877
- Rank: Colonel
- Conflicts: Crimean War; Franco-Prussian War: Battle of Mars-la-Tour; Battle of Gravelotte; Mokrani Revolt: Capture of Palestro (1871); Battle of Alma; Battle of the Col des Beni Aïcha
- Awards: Legion of Honour

Alexandre Édouard Constant Fourchault (19 August 1817 – 10 April 1884) was a French officer.

== Studies ==
He studied at the Lycée Benjamin-Franklin d'Orléans with several senior officers of the French Army and French politicians.

He was trained militarily in the École spéciale militaire de Saint-Cyr and in the École d'application du Corps royal d'état-major.

He did his infantry training with the 58th line in Algeria in 1843, passed to the 3rd chasseurs the following year, and was attached to the Bourges division in 1847.

== Career ==
=== Conquest of Algeria ===
He served in North Africa during the French conquest of Algeria.

=== Crimean War ===
He took part in the Crimean War from 1854 to 1856.

=== Franco-Prussian War ===
He returned to Algeria, then took part in the Franco-Prussian War of 1870, in particular in the battles of:

- Battle of Mars-la-Tour, in Moselle (August 16–18, 1870): where heavy fighting broke out between the French forces and the Prussian troops commanded by General August Karl von Goeben;
- Battle of Gravelotte (August 18, 1870): Where Bazaine had to retreat to Metz after conceding a defeat from the French forces.

He was taken prisoner in Germany with 17 other officers and then escaped from prison, while he was ranked as lieutenant-colonel in the general staff.

=== Mokrani Revolt ===
He participated in Algeria in the repression of the Mokrani revolt from April 1871.

He presided over the Battle of Alma and Battle of the Col des Beni Aïcha on 19 April 1871, with general Orphis Léon Lallemand, through which he countered the Algerian rebels.

== Awards ==
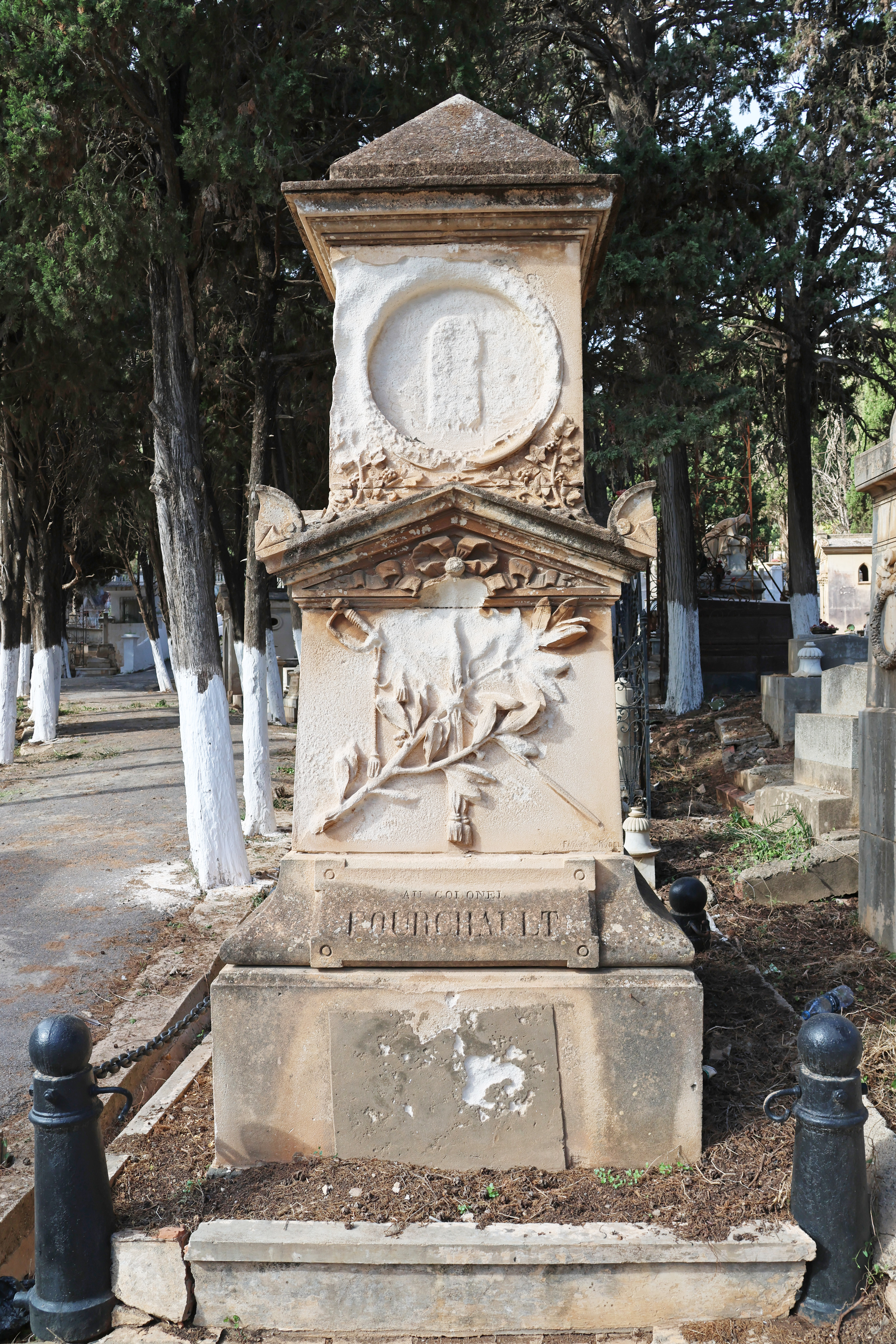
Tomb of Alexandre Fourchault

He was attached to the general staff of the Army of Africa, and was decorated as Knight of the Legion of Honour on August 16, 1850.

== Death ==
He ended his career on 23 October 1877 and his life in Algiers with the rank of cavalry colonel on 10 April 1884.

His funeral gave rise to an imposing demonstration when he was buried in the St. Eugene Cemetery in Algiers.

== Monument ==
A commemorative monument was raised to him by public subscription in 1885, in the St. Eugene Cemetery, on land granted in perpetuity by the city of Algiers.
