= Bedouin music =

Music of nomadic Bedouin Arab tribes

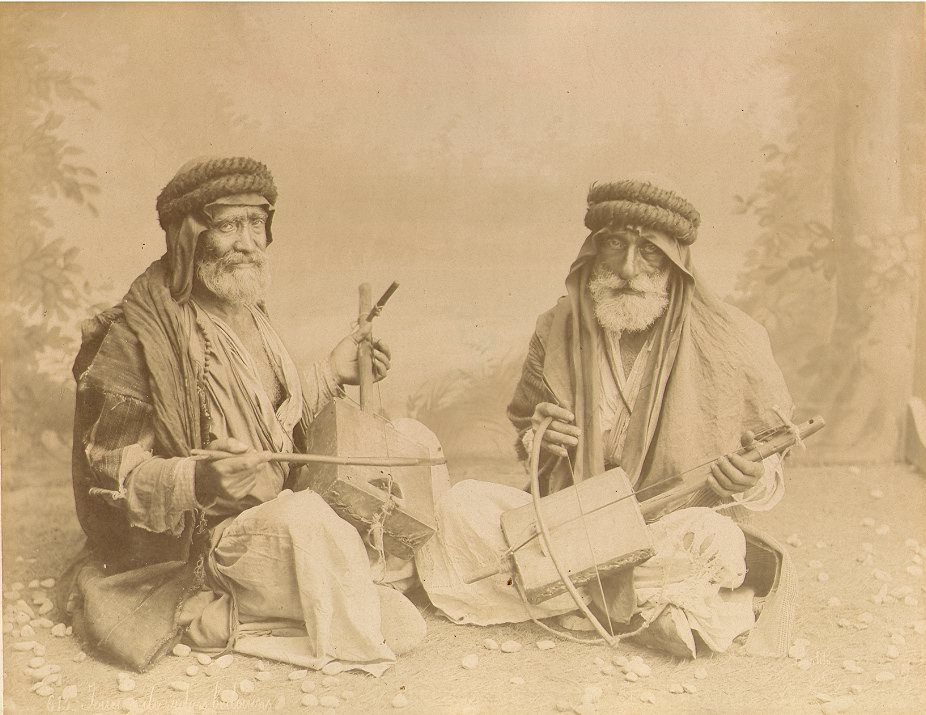
Bedouin violin players, Middle East, circa 1880s.

Bedouin music (Arabic: الموسيقى البدوية) is the music of nomadic Bedouin Arab tribes in the Arabian Peninsula, North Africa, Mesopotamia and the Levant. It is closely linked to its text and poems. Songs are based on poetry and are sung either unaccompanied, or to the stringed instrument, the rebab. Traditional instruments are the rebab and various woodwinds. Examples of Bedouin music are the Samri of Saudi Arabia, Aita of Morocco, and the internationally recognised Rai of Algeria.
