= Ouled Boumerdès =

- Motto: أولاد بومرداس
- Interactive map of Ouled Boumerdès
- Coordinates: 36.6780076°N 3.5176461°E
- Commune: Tidjelabine
- District: Boumerdès District
- Province: Boumerdès Province
- Region: Kabylie
- Country: Algeria

Area
  - Total: 5 km^{2} (1.9 sq mi)

Dimensions
  - Length: 2 km (1.2 mi)
  - Width: 2.5 km (1.6 mi)
- Elevation: 530 m (1,740 ft)
- Time zone: UTC+01:00
- Area code: 35021

Ouled Boumerdès is a village in the Boumerdès Province in Kabylie, Algeria.

== Location ==
The village is surrounded by Meraldene River and Boumerdès River and the towns of Thénia and Tidjelabine in the Khachna mountain range.

== Religion ==
- Zawiyet Sidi Boumerdassi

== Notable people ==
- Cheikh Boumerdassi (1818-1874)
- Mohamed Boumerdassi (1936-2010)
- Nadia Boumerdassi (1986-)
