= Orphis Léon Lallemand =

French soldier and officer

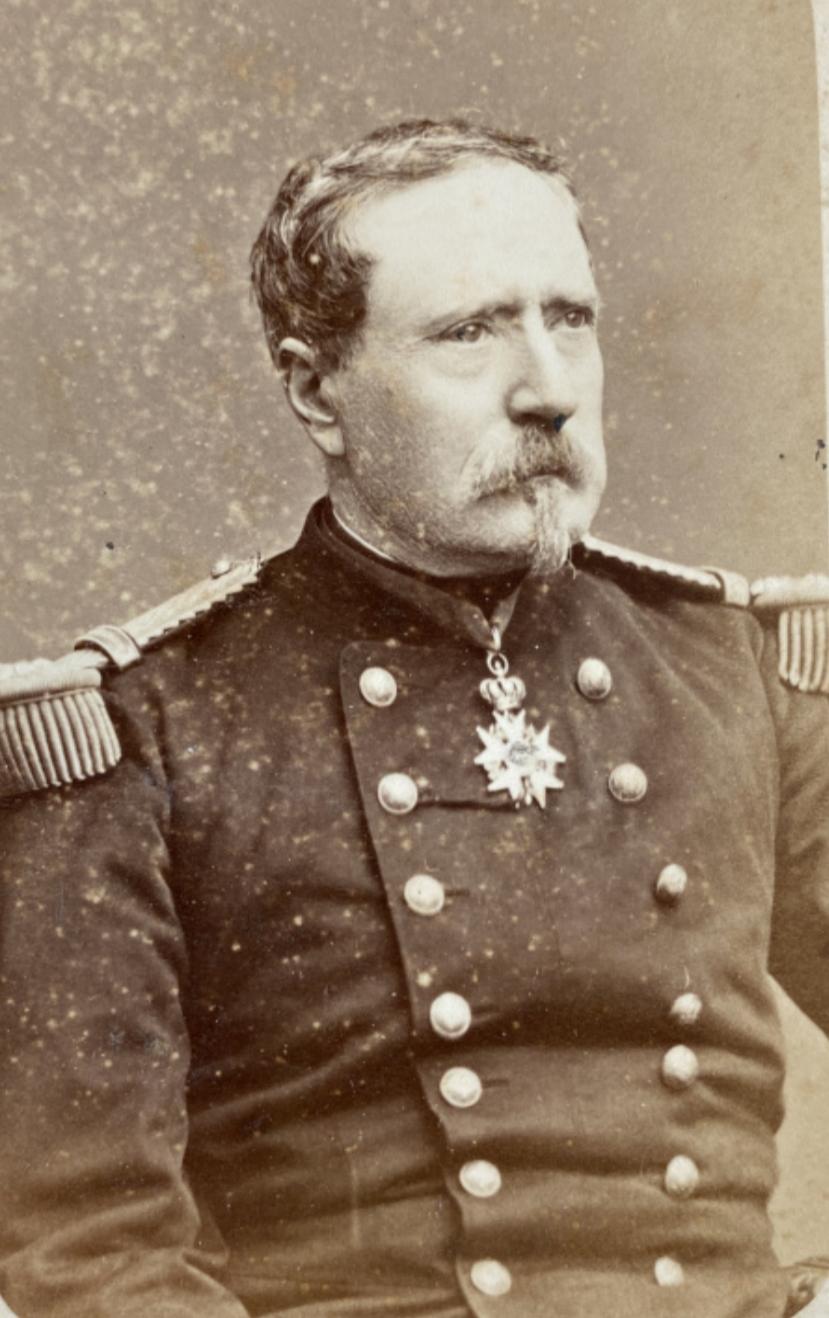
- Born: Orphis Léon Lallemand; 27 September 1817; Éteignières, France
- Died: 20 December 1893 (aged 84); Éteignières, France
- Military career
- Allegiance: France
- Branch: French Army
- Service years: 1837–1887
- Rank: General
- Conflicts: Mokrani Revolt: Battle of Alma; Battle of the Col des Beni Aïcha
- Awards: Legion of Honour

Orphis Léon Lallemand (27 September 1817 – 20 December 1893) was a French officer.

== Career ==
=== Conquest of Algeria ===
He arrived in Algeria in May 1842 as a lieutenant of General staff to serve in North Africa during the French conquest of Algeria.

He served successively with the 53rd infantry regiment, the 9th regiment of hunters on horseback and the 4th African Hunter Regiment, from 1842 to 1846.

He took part in the expeditions of the Troupes coloniales to which these regiments were then called in the provinces of Algiers and Oran.

He was then attached to the General staff of the Oran division under Generals Louis Juchault de Lamoricière, Aimable Pélissier and Pierre Bosquet.

=== Mokrani Revolt ===
He participated in Algeria in the repression of the Mokrani revolt from April 1871.

He presided over the Battle of Alma and Battle of the Col des Beni Aïcha on 19 April 1871, with colonel Alexandre Fourchault, through which he countered the Algerian rebels.

=== Return to France ===
On his return to France, General Lallemand was invested with the command of the 15th military division.

He was placed on leave of absence at the end of 1887.

== Awards ==
He was appointed as a general of division on 24 November 1870.

At the age of 42, he was already a general staff colonel, then was decorated as an officer of the Legion of Honour.

== Death ==
He ended his career on 1887 and his life in Éteignières with the rank of general on 20 December 1893.
