= Seddouk =

Coordinates: 36°33′N 4°41′E

Seddouk Sedduq (Kabyle)
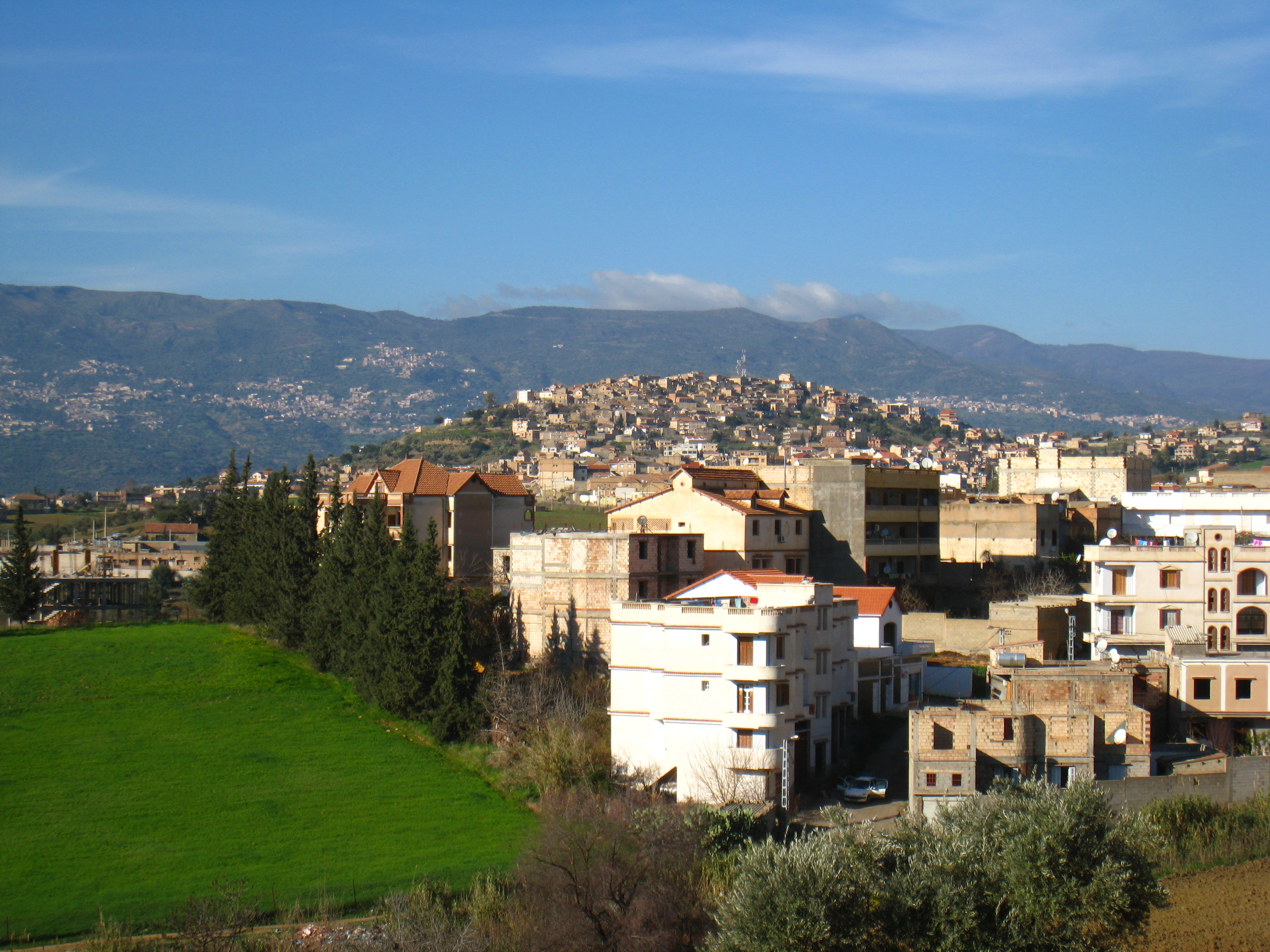

- Country: Algeria
- Province: Béjaïa
- Time zone: UTC+1 (West Africa Time)

Seddouk (Kabyle: Sedduq, Arabic: صَدُوق) is a commune in northern Algeria in the Béjaïa Province. The Béni Mansour–Bejaïa railway traverses this community.
