= Boudouaou =

Coordinates: 36.73°N 3.41°E

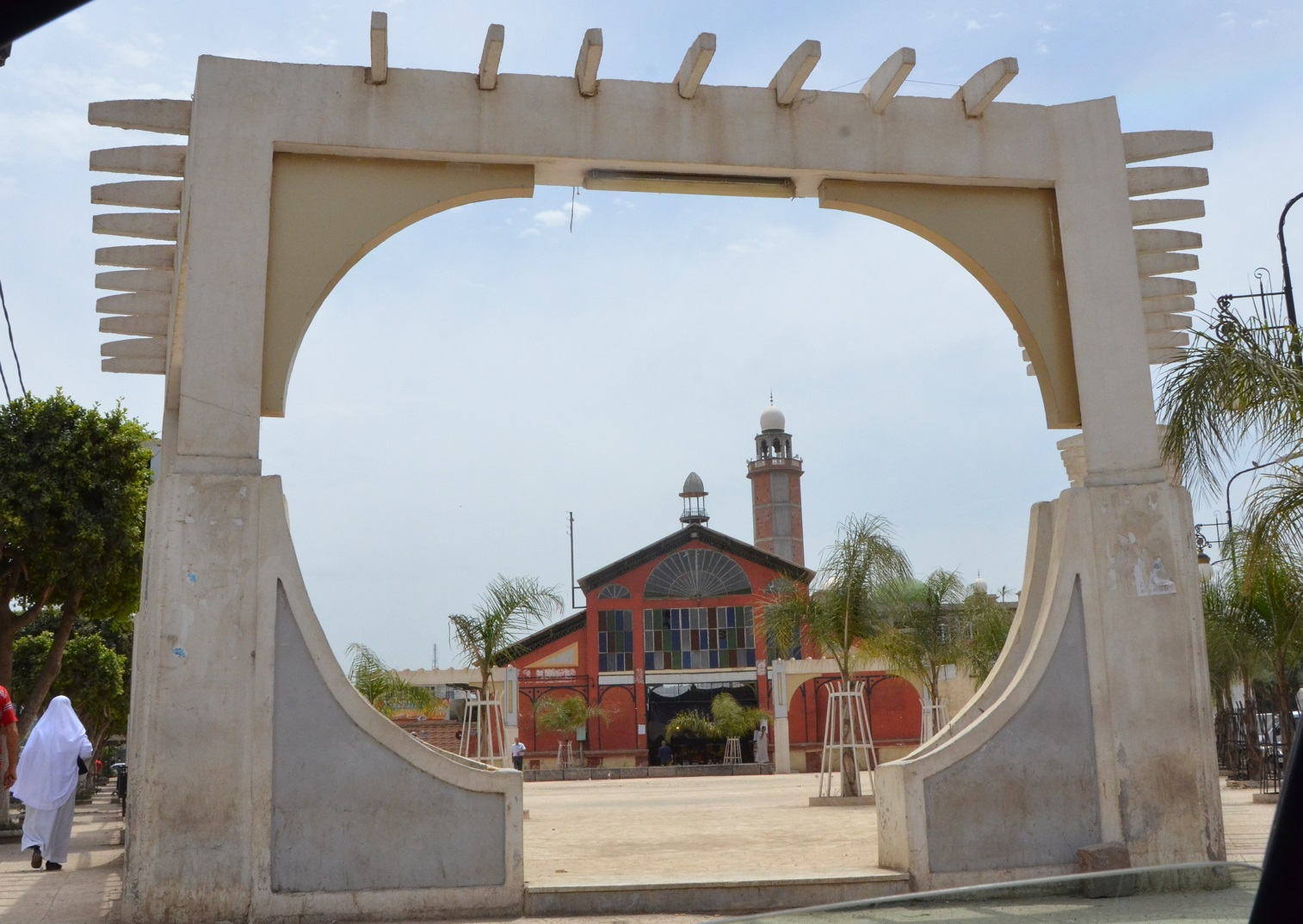

- Location within Algeria
- Country: Algeria

Population (2008)
  - Total: 56,398
- Time zone: UTC+1 (CET)

Boudouaou, during French colonialism known as L'Alma (or Alma) is a town in the western part of Boumerdès, Algeria. It is a coastal town on the Mediterranean Sea. Its population in 2008 was 56,398. It is located 18 miles east of the capital Algiers.

The original name is thought to be bou-dhou-aou, Arabic for illuminator in reference to a small insect the size of a beetle which at night shows beautiful brilliant green light in its tail.

== Archaeology ==
Several prehistoric vestiges were discovered during the period of occupation. With the arrival of the colonizers and the project of colonization on the lands of Boudouaou, many prehistoric vestiges under the occupation were discovered: rhinoceros bones house in the Musée de l'Homme in Paris, a bronze axe, flint Retouched and prehistoric arrows are examples of discoveries already made.

== Politics ==
The town re-elected mayor Yahya Mahsas at the end of 2007 for 5 years, replaced by Mekki Hamoud in 2012.

== Main cities ==
There are several villages in Boudouaou. The well known among them are:

- Lacace (لاصاص)
- Benadjal (بن عجال)
- Ghoualem (الغوالم)
- El-Nchite (النشيط)
- Ben Merzouga (بن مرزوقة)
- Ben Yamina (بن يامينة)

== History ==
=== French conquest ===
- Expedition of the Col des Beni Aïcha (1837)
- First Battle of Boudouaou (1837)
- First Battle of the Issers (1837)
- Battle of Alma (1871)

=== Salafist terrorism ===
- 2006 Boudouaou bombing (8 August 2006)

== Notable people ==
- Ahmed Mahsas, Algerian politician and writer
- Rachid Mimouni, Algerian writer
- Walid Derrardja, Algerian footballer
