= Lakhdaria =

Lakhdaria Ait Ulmu ⵍⴰⵅⴷⴰⵔⵉⴰ الأخضرية
- Commune and town
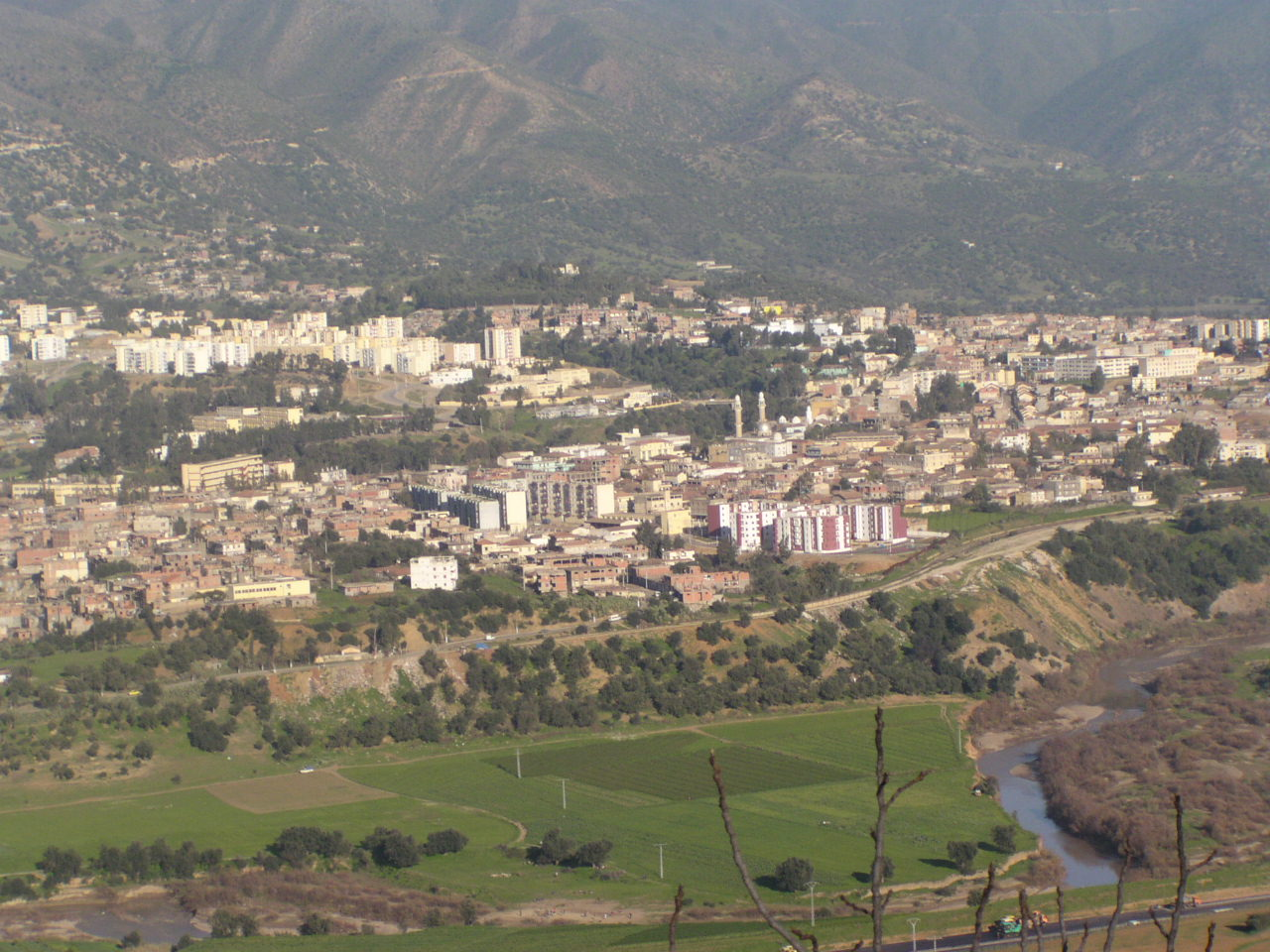

- Location within Algeria
- Coordinates: 36°33′44″N 3°35′40″E
- Country: Algeria
- Province: Bouïra Province

Population (2008)
  - Total: 42,886
- Time zone: UTC+1 (CET)

Lakhdaria (Arabic: الأخضرية), is a town in northern Algeria, in the Bouïra Province. It is located 50 miles (75 km) south east of Algiers. It is surrounded by the Kabylie mountains and by a 3-mile (4.8 km) long river named Oued Isser, passing by rocky mountains called the grottoes of Lakhdaira.

== History ==
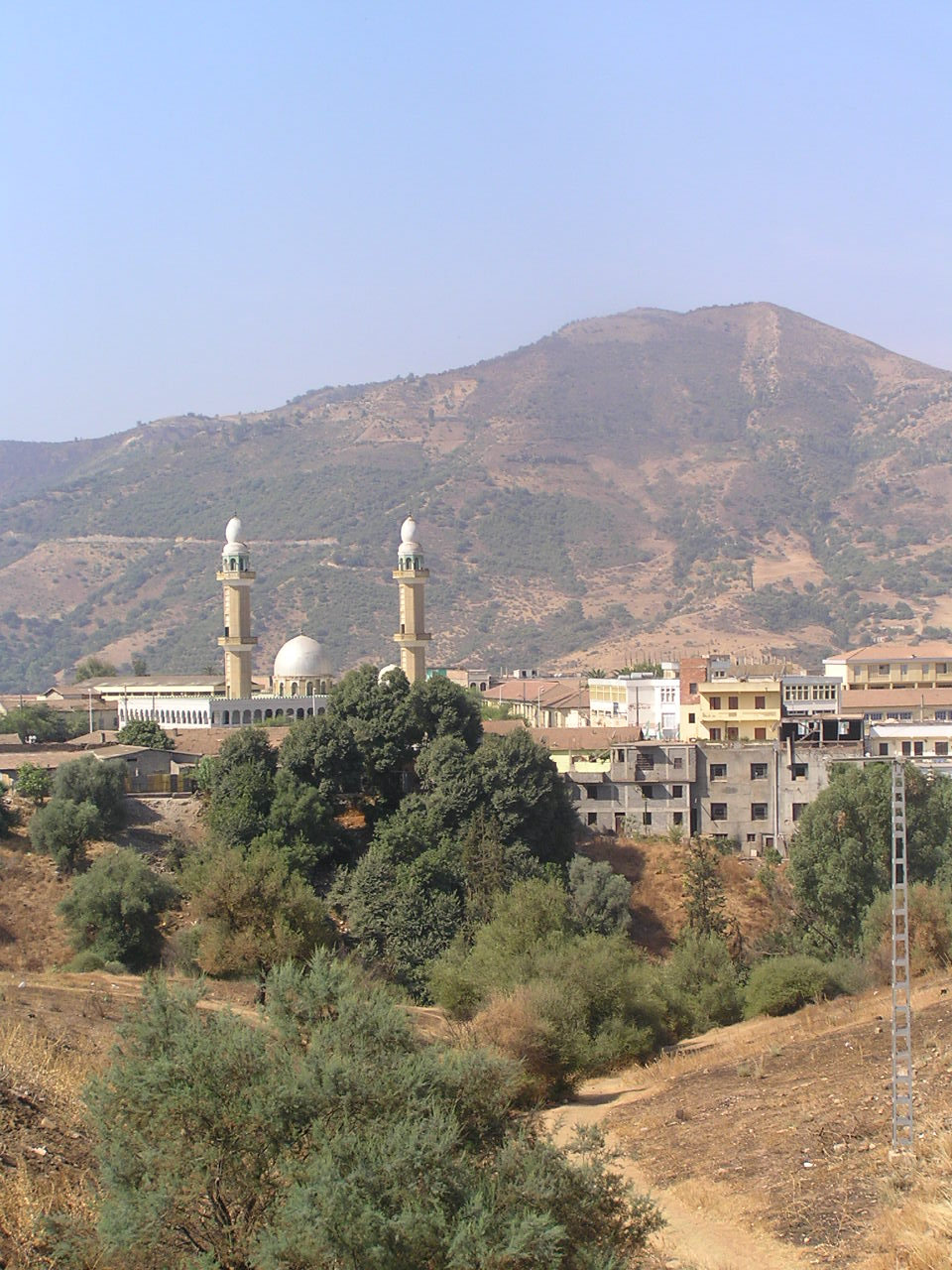
Minarets in the city

The town was named Palestro when it was founded in 1860, it was named in honour of the Franco-Piedmontese victory over Austria at Palestro in 1859 during the Second Italian War of Independence. It was renamed Lakhdaria after Algerian independence in honour of Mokrani Rabah Lakhdar, known as Si Lakhdar, a senior FLN leader during the Algerian War.

== Population ==
The population is now around 59,009 people. Farming, construction and transportation are the main sources of employment of the local population. Some residents also commute to Algiers for work. The city is very busy, people like to do shopping and meeting in coffee shops and mosques.

== Agriculture ==
Agriculture prevails in the area, especially vegetables and olive trees on family farms, many located at the bottom of the mountains that surround the area.

== Industry ==
A telecommunication site located in the eastern part of Lakhdaria includes huge television transmitters and receivers that are used by Algerian television.
