= Thaalibia (disambiguation) =

Thaalibia Quran is a mushaf written in Algeria.

Thaalibia may also refer to:

- Thaalibia Publishing, an Algerian publishing house
- Thaalibia Cemetery, in the Casbah of Algiers, Algeria
- Madrasa Thaalibia, in Algiers, Algeria
- Zawiya Thaalibia (Algiers), in the Casbah of Algiers, Algeria
- Zawiya Thaalibia (Issers), in the Issers, Algeria

== See also ==
- Tha'alibi (surname)
