= Bou Qobrine =

Bou Qobrine may refer to:

- Sidi M'hamed Bou Qobrine, an Algerian theologian and Sufi
- Sidi M'hamed Bou Qobrine, a municipality in Algiers Province
- Sidi M'hamed Bou Qobrine Cemetery, a cemetery in Algiers Province
- Sidi M'hamed Bou Qobrine District, a district in Algiers Province
