= Belouizdad =

Belouizdad may refer to:

- Belouizdad, Algiers, a quarter of Algiers, Algiers Province, Algeria
- CR Belouizdad, a professional football club in the Mohamed Belouizdad district, Algiers

== People ==
- Amina Belouizdad (1932–2015), first female presenter on Algerian television
- Islam Belouizdad (born 1987), real name of Algerian-French artist Hayce Lemsi
- Mohamed Belouizdad (1924–1952), Algerian militant and politician
