= Garidi =

Garidi may refer to:

- Sidi Garidi Cemetery, is a cemetery in Algiers.
- Mohamed Ryad Garidi, is an Algerian rower.
