= Mohamed Missouri =

Algerian medalist boxer and coach

Personal information
- Nationality: Algerian
- Born: محمد ميسوري; 7 December 1947 Thénia, Algeria
- Died: 29 June 2015 (aged 67) Algiers, Algeria
- Weight: Middleweight

Boxing career

Boxing record
- Total fights: 154
- Wins: 139
- Losses: 13
- Draws: 2
Medal record
Men's amateur boxing
Representing Algeria
All-Africa Games
Gold medal – first place	1978 Algiers	Middleweight
Bronze medal – third place	1973 Lagos	Middleweight
Mediterranean Games
Gold medal – first place	1975 Algiers	Middleweight
Pan Arab Games
Gold medal – first place	1976 Damascus	Middleweight
Maghreb Athletics Championships
Gold medal – first place	1973 Agadir	Middleweight
Algerian National Championships
Gold medal – first place	1970 Algiers	Middleweight

Mohamed Missouri (Arabic: محمد ميسوري; 7 December 1947 – 29 June 2015) was an Algerian amateur boxer and coach.

== Early life ==
Missouri was born in 1947 in the village of Merchicha within the Col des Beni Aïcha region, in the east of the Khachna Massif and in the south of the town of Thénia before the Algerian independence.

He lived his young age in the mountainous and wooded region near the course of Oued Meraldene and its Meraldene Dam, and not far from the Zawiyet Sidi Boushaki in the aftermath of the World War II and in the period preceding the outbreak of the Algerian Revolution.

He completed his primary studies in the midst of the independence war in the boys' school (French: École de Garçons) in Thénia (former Ménerville), which was renamed Mohamed Farhi school after 1962.

== Career ==
Missouri enlisted in his youth in the military body of the Gendarmerie Nationale, then distinguished himself in boxing and military sports.

Missouri perfected in the discipline of boxing in the USM El Harrach team with trainer Abdelkader Kossaïri, then opted for the CR Belouizdad team where he was supported by trainer Brahim Bouafia, former boxing champion and national trainer, who welcomed him with open arms.

Bouafia passed on his knowledge to Missouri from 1969 and trained him in boxing, emphasizing discipline and proper practice.

After his selection as a professional boxer, Missouri was thus framed in his future exploits by Bouafia who was then assisted by his two assistants, the Polish Granichec and the Algerian Akli Kebbab.

Bouafia managed the young boxer Missouri well during the national interligue tournament in Oran in July 1969 which was held in the Nedjma cinema, and this allowed him to win the heavyweight title.

During the various national boxing competitions in which he participated, Missouri won the title of champion of Algeria 9 times.

He was Maghrebian champion in 1973 in Agadir, then Arab champion in 1976 in Damascus, and then gold medalist at the Mediterranean Games of Algiers in 1975, at the Hacène Harcha Arena, after his victory in the final against the Egyptian Khalil Ali Khalti.

Indeed, it was then the trainer Kouider Ayad who supervised Missouri in the national A boxing team in 1975 when he participated in the Mediterranean Games and that he collected with his colleagues Hocine Nini and Siad the count of seven medals including two in gold.

During the decade of 1969 and 1979, he played 154 national and international fights, winning 139, losing 13 and drawing twice.

== Coach ==
After retiring from the military, Missouri took internships to earn his boxing coaching degrees to teach this noble art to younger generations.

He created a boxing school for gendarmes and sailors, he launched a new professional dynamic for the training and maintenance of the physical fitness of Algerian military personnel.

By converting to coaching for a period of 25 years, he notably led the boxing team of the Gendarmerie Nationale and that of the Algerian National Navy.

Missouri's efforts aimed to contribute to building a modern sport and an elite crop capable of honoring national colors at international forums and responding to the tremendous sacrifices made by the Algerian people in order to emancipate from the yoke of French colonialism.

He also holds two diplomas, one as a teacher of physical education and sports, and the other as a professional boxing trainer of class III.

He also led the National Military Boxing Team which competed in the 1995 Military World Games organized in Rome, Italy.

== Awards ==
Missouri won several fights in national and international championships and then received trophies and medals, including:

- Gold medal at the 1978 All-Africa Games in Algiers, Algeria (middleweight)
- Gold medal at the 1975 Mediterranean Games in Algiers, Algeria (middleweight)
- Gold medal at the 1976 Pan Arab Games in Damascus, Syria (middleweight)
- Bronze medal at the 1973 All-Africa Games in Lagos, Nigeria (middleweight)
- Gold medal at the 1973 Maghreb Athletics Championships in Agadir, Morocco (middleweight)
- Gold medal at the Algerian championships 9 times in Algiers, Algeria (middleweight)

== Books ==
Missouri has written several books during a long sporting career, including:

- (2004) Boxing Through the Ages (Arabic: الملاكمة عبر العصور).
- (2009) Boxing giants: Professionalism in the Twentieth Century (Arabic: عمالقة الملاكمة: الاحتراف في القرن العشرين).
- (2014) Boxing is an art of nobility (Arabic: الملاكمة فن النبلاء).
- Boxing is life and exercise (Arabic: الملاكمة حياة وممارسة).
- How to practice the art of boxing (Arabic: كيف نمارس فن الملاكمة).

== Disciples ==
Missouri has coached several boxers who have won medals and awards in international games on the National Military Team, including:

- Mohamed Allalou (born 1973)

== Death ==
Monday, 29 June 2015 Missouri died at the age of 68, following a long illness.

He had been hospitalized at the Aïn Naâdja military hospital in the Algiers Province.

He was buried on Tuesday, 30 June 2015 after the Zuhr prayer in the Sidi Garidi Cemetery within the commune of Kouba in Algiers, in the presence of a large crowd of his family and friends.

== See also ==
- Sport in Algeria
- Algeria national boxing team
- Algeria at the Olympics
- 1973 Maghreb Athletics Championships
- 1973 All-Africa Games
- Pan Arab Games
- 1975 Mediterranean Games
- Boxing at the 1975 Mediterranean Games
- Algeria at the Paralympics
- Algeria at the African Games
- Algeria at the Mediterranean Games
- Algeria at the Pan Arab Games
- Military World Games
- 1995 Military World Games
- List of Algerians
- List of Algerian writers
- Sidi Garidi Cemetery

== Bibliography ==
- Mohamed Missouri (2004). Boxing Through the Ages الملاكمة عبر العصور. Algiers: ANEP. p. 336 pages.
- Mohamed Missouri (2009). Boxing giants: Professionalism in the Twentieth Century عمالقة الملاكمة: الاحترافية في القرن العشرين. Algiers: Dar Othmania. p. 304 pages.
- Mohamed Missouri (2014). Boxing is an art of nobility الملاكمة فن النبلاء. Algiers: Éditions Al-Arab. p. 300 pages.
