= 1973 Maghreb Athletics Championships =

6th Maghreb Athletics Championships
- Dates: 27–29 July
- Host city: Agadir, Morocco
- Events: 36
- Participation: 3 nations

The 1973 Maghreb Athletics Championships was the sixth edition of the international athletics competition between the countries of the Maghreb. Algeria, Tunisia and Morocco were the competing nations. Organised by the Union des Fédérations d'Athlétisme du Maghreb Uni (Union of Athletics Federations of the United Maghreb), it took place from 27–29 July in Agadir, Morocco. It was the third Moroccan city to host the event, after Rabat in 1967 and Casablanca in 1971. A total of 36 athletics events were contested, 22 for men and 14 for women.

The event winners were distributed fairly evenly between the teams, with Morocco and Tunisia each taking thirteen gold medals and Algeria having the remaining ten. Tunisia topped the table by merit of having more silver medals. Track events were only officially timed to the tenth of a second.

== Medal summary ==
=== Men ===
Event	Gold		Silver		Bronze	
100 metres	Toufik Chaouch (ALG)	10.7	Omar Ghizlat (MAR)	10.8	El Hadi Sayah (ALG)	10.9
200 metres	Omar Ghizlat (MAR)	22.0	Toufik Chaouch (ALG)	22.2	Salah Gadri (TUN)	22.7
400 metres	Mohamed Sid Ali Djouadi (ALG)	48.8	Mokhtar Herzi (TUN)	49.4	Salah Gadri (TUN)	49.6
800 metres	Amakdouf Mohamed Ayachi (MAR)	1:53.4	Mohamed Sid Ali Djouadi (ALG)	1:53.6	Azzedine Azzouzi (ALG)	1:54.0
1500 metres	Azzedine Azzouzi (ALG)	3:50.1	Amakdouf Mohamed Ayachi (MAR)	3:50.7	Kamel Guemmar (ALG)	3:52.4
5000 metres	Abdelkader Zaddem (TUN)	14:36.4	Mohamed Kacemi (ALG)	14:40.4	Djelloul Rezig (ALG)	14:41.4
10,000 metres	Abdelkader Zaddem (TUN)	29:14.4	Boualem Rahoui (ALG)	29:32.2	Chérif Benali (ALG)	30:15.4
110 m hurdles	Abdelkader Boudjemaa (ALG)	14.8	Moncef Belkacem (TUN)	15.2	Naoui (MAR)	15.4
400 m hurdles	Abdallah Rouine (TUN)	53.5	Moncef Belkacem (TUN)	53.7	Abouam (MAR)	55.4
3000 metres steeplechase	Boualem Rahoui (ALG)	9:01.8	Abdelaziz Bouguerra (TUN)	9:18.8	Mohamed Benbaraka (MAR)	9:20.4
4×100 m relay	Tunisia (TUN)	42.1	Morocco (MAR)	42.5	Unknown	???
4×400 m relay	Tunisia (TUN)	3:22.3	Morocco (MAR)	3:22.4	Unknown	???
20 km walk	Bouralass (TUN)	1:41:12	Unknown athlete	???	Unknown athlete	???
High jump	Douiri (MAR)	1.86 m	Kanouni (MAR)	1.80 m	Ben Salma (TUN)	1.80 m
Pole vault	Lakhdar Rahal (ALG)	4.32 m	Ahmed Rezki (ALG)	4.11 m	Alouini (TUN)	3.70 m
Long jump	Youssef Khémiri (TUN)	7.28 m	Slim Kilani (TUN)	6.81 m	Hocine Boudiffa (ALG)	6.79 m
Triple jump	Lakhdar Merouane (ALG)	14.89 m	Saïda Sassi (TUN)	14.22 m	Youssef Khémiri (TUN)	14.14 m
Shot put	Jean-Marie Djebaili (ALG)	16.77 m	Mohamed Bahri (TUN)	14.54 m	Noureddine Bendifallah (ALG)	13.95 m
Discus throw	Jean-Marie Djebaili (ALG)	51.08 m	Abdeljaouad Bedira (TUN)	44.71 m	Jacques Zazoui (ALG)	42.98 m
Hammer throw	Youssef Ben Abid (TUN)	48.92 m	Jean-Marie Djebaili (ALG)	47.44 m	Noureddine Bendifallah (ALG)	46.14 m
Javelin throw	Ali Memmi (TUN)	63.10 m	Maamar Boubekeur (ALG)	57.36 m	Not awarded	
Decathlon	Mohamed Kissi (MAR)	5972 pts	Mohamed Bensaad (ALG)	5825 pts	Alain Smaïl (ALG)	5821 pts

=== Women ===
Event	Gold		Silver		Bronze	
100 metres	Oujaa (MAR)	12.6	Malika Hadky (MAR)	12.9	Unknown athlete	???
200 metres	Oujaa (MAR)	26.7	Fatma Ben Hdar (TUN)	26.8	Unknown athlete	???
400 metres	Malika Hadky (MAR)	58.7	Oujaa (MAR)	59.1	Unknown athlete	???
800 metres	Souad Dérouiche (TUN)	2:19.2	Zeineb Dérouiche (TUN)	2:20.0	Fatima Ennai (MAR)	2:21.0
1500 metres	Souad Dérouiche (TUN)	4:39.2	Khaddouj Hanine (MAR)	4:46.2	Jalila Douira (TUN)	4:50.5
100 m hurdles	Chérifa Meskaoui (MAR)	15.5	Naïma Benboubker (MAR)	15.7	Unknown athlete	???
4×100 m relay	Morocco (MAR)	50.1	Tunisia (TUN)	51.4	Unknown	???
4×400 m relay	Tunisia (TUN)	4:08.4	Morocco (MAR)	4:11.3	Unknown	???
High jump	Tigmi (MAR)	1.51 m	Messaouda Ouchérif (ALG)	1.48 m	Unknown athlete	??? m
Long jump	Naïma Benboubker (MAR)	5.21 m	Naciri (MAR)	5.01 m	Unknown athlete	??? m
Shot put	Leïla Chamine (TUN)	12.14 m	Chérifa Meskaoui (MAR)	12.10 m	Unknown athlete	??? m
Discus throw	Chérifa Meskaoui (MAR)	37.89 m	Jeli (TUN)	34.37 m	Unknown athlete	??? m
Javelin throw	Bellabas (ALG)	33.94 m	Zohra Ouertani (TUN)	29.44 m	Unknown athlete	??? m
Pentathlon	Chérifa Meskaoui (MAR)	3150 pts	Saïda Sassi (TUN)	2503 pts	Unknown athlete	???? pts
