= Tha'alibi (surname) =

Tha'alibi is an Arabic surname. Notable people with the surname include:

- Abu Mansour al-Hosein ibn Muhammad al-Marghani, Persian-born Islamic historian
- Abdelaziz Thâalbi (1876–1944), Tunisian politician
- Sidi Abder Rahman El Thaelebi (1384–1479), Islamic scholar
- Ahmad ibn Muhammad al-Tha'labi (died 1030s), Islamic scholar

== See also ==
- Tha'alibi or Abu Mansur 'Abd ul-Malik ibn Muhammad ibn Isma'il Neyshapuri, Persian-born Arabic philologist
- Thaalibia (disambiguation)
