= Abdelkader Medjaoui =

- عبد القادر المجاوي
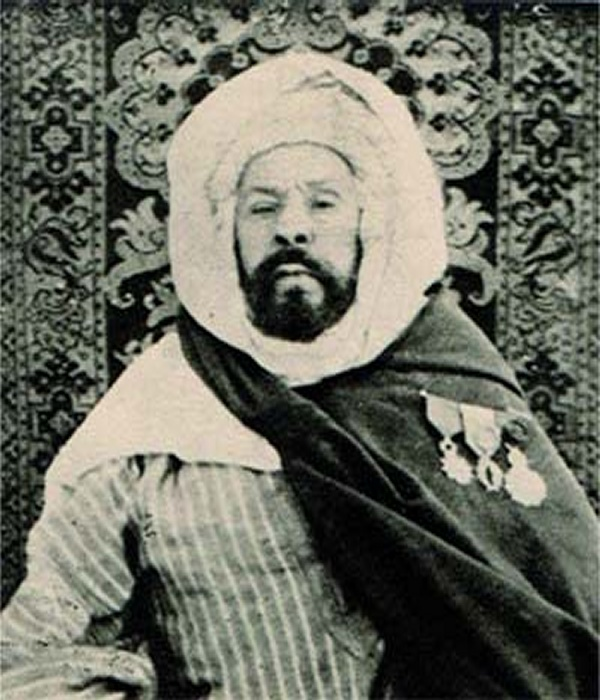
- Portrait of El Medjaoui
- Born: 1848; Tlemcen, Algeria
- Died: 6 October 1914 (aged 65–66); Constantine, Algeria
- Other names: Abdelkader Madjaoui (alternate spelling)
- Occupations: scholar and jurist
- Parents: Abdullah bin Muhammad bin Abd al-Karim (father); Aisha bint al-Hajj al-Senussi (mother)

Abdelkader Medjaoui (1848 – 6 October 1914) was an Algerian scholar and jurist.

== Origins ==
Abdelkader Medjaoui was born in Tlemcen (in the year 1267 AH / 1848 AD) to a father called Abdullah bin Muhammad bin Abd al-Karim who was a judge in Tlemcen for about 25 years, and a mother called Aisha bint al-Hajj al-Senussi. The surname Medjaoui (which may also be spelled Madjaoui) is related to Medjaoua, a tribe in Taza, Morocco.

== Biography ==
After his studies in his hometown, he moved to spread knowledge in Fez, Tangier, and the Al-Qarawiyyin Mosque.

He studied Islamic jurisprudence (fiqh) and its origins, the inheritance jurisprudence (al faraid), koranic exegesis (tafsir), the hadith (prophet's sayings) and tasawwuf as well as the science of logic and astrology, history and literature despite his own abilities in understanding. The Farouk newspaper said that he did not read again any book that he read once.

His teachers in Fez observed his scientific competences and perseverance in his work. They therefore allowed him to teach . He was known for his purity, generosity, boldness and courage, and his determination as well as his eloquence and humility he was religious and proud of his Islamic personality and protective of his religion and language even when surrounded by Europeans.

The teaching in mosques was necessary to achieve the goal of preserving the Islamic identity especially with the attempts of the colonial integrative administration, and the growing danger of Christian education.

He then returned to Algeria in the 1875, and after that he performed the Hajj, after he returned to teach first in Constantine, Algeria, where he resided, married and had children.

His work was not only limited to teaching in a mosque but also he also contributed on revitalize independent schools, his activity focused on the work offered by the French administration as the imam in the mosque of Sidi Katani, he accepted this offer and worked also as a teacher in the Katania school. In 1878 he reached different sciences and religious studies such as the memorization of Quran, the hadith, jurisprudence, logic, literature, astronomy and arithmetic. In 1898, he was appointed by the French administration in the Thaalibia School, perhaps to gain control of him. He continued his activity in the capital and contributed in supporting the cultural atmosphere in it, along with Abd Elhamid Ben Soumia.

Algiers during this period was suffering from mismanagement and corruption .He had to double his reform efforts and paid attention to the religious and moral education to establish the correct Islamic faith in the hearts of his students he influenced the cultural life in the capital through institutions, clubs and associations.

He tried to give an approach to education based on new sciences he dedicated a part of his interest to the educator as an important condition in the educational operation. El Madjaoui was also interested in the economic aspects and urged Algerians to follow westerners on what they have achieved in this field and new sciences.

-Abdelkader Medjaoui

— "The Arabic language is one of the oldest languages in the world used today and one of the most extensive, I prefer it to other languages. Even a non-Arabic speaker uses it to make his declaration of faith. It is the most eloquent language in logic and demonstration, which best expresses dialectics, the most artistic in prose and poetry. Allah has filled it with arts and wisdom .He alone knew how to take advantage of old and new proverbs."

He died in Constantine, Algeria on October 6, 1914, leaving behind him a good trace: his students and scholars who followed his path as well as deeds represented in books and writings which varied in type and quality.

== Works ==
- Le guide des élèves, book of Arabic linguistics, syntax and rhetoric. Published in Egypt.
- Les conseils de Murid, Sufi spiritual guide. Published in Tunisia.
- Explication de Ibn Hichem, book of Arabic linguistics, syntax and rhetoric. Published in Constantine.
- Système en astronomie, manuscript.
