= Cemeteries of Algiers =

There are a number of cemeteries in Algiers. Among them is the Thaalibia Cemetery, the oldest one. A number of them have listed buildings or structures, or have been classified and registered as historic Algiers heritage.

== List ==
Cemetery Name	Date opened	Location	Postal code	Closed	Remarks	Coordinates
Thaalibia Cemetery	1460	Casbah of Algiers	16022	No	Oldest Muslim cemetery of Algiers	36.7884585°N 3.0595775°E
Sidi Garidi Cemetery	1730	Kouba	16050	No	An old cemetery in Algiers	36.7233378°N 3.0708074°E
Sidi M'hamed Bou Qobrine Cemetery	1790	Belouizdad	16015	No	Tariqa Rahmaniyya cemetery of Algiers	36.75018°N 3.0652514°E
El Kettar Cemetery	1838	Bab El Oued	16008	No	Popular cemetery of Algiers	36.7852071°N 3.0495789°E
St. Eugene Cemetery	1849	Bologhine	16090	No	Christian and Jewish cemetery of Algiers	36.7988637°N 3.0473248°E
El Alia Cemetery	1928	Bab Ezzouar	16042	No	Official and State cemetery of Algiers	36.7190129°N 3.1657643°E

== Gallery ==
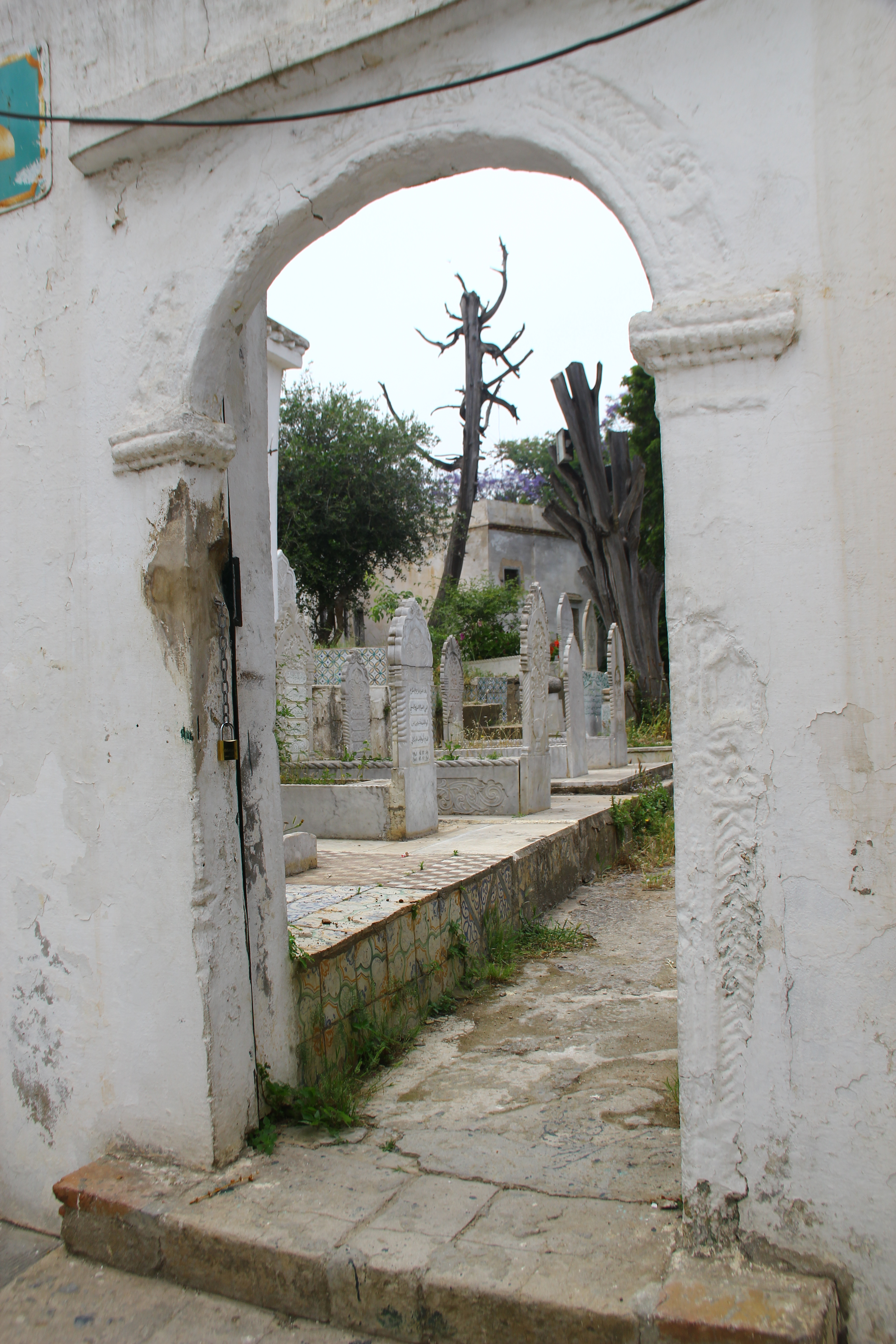
Thaalibia Cemetery

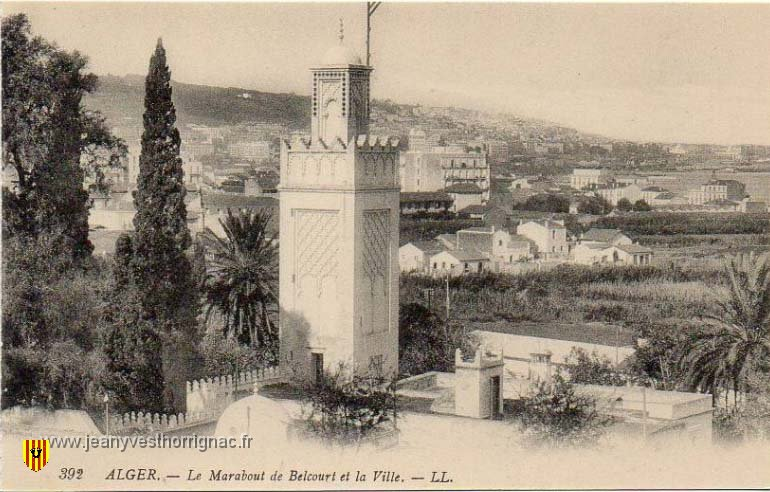
Sidi M'hamed Bou Qobrine Cemetery

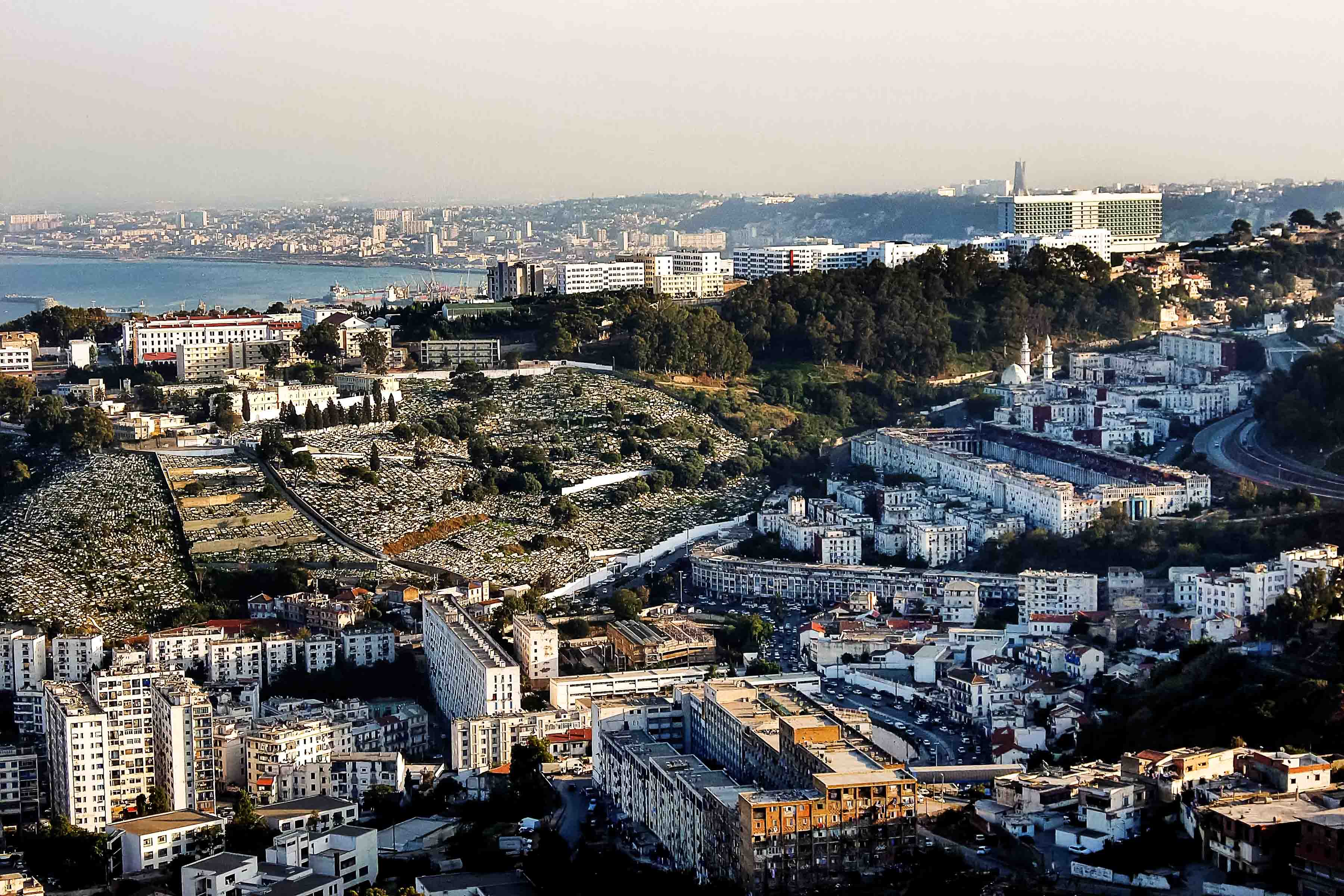
El Kettar Cemetery

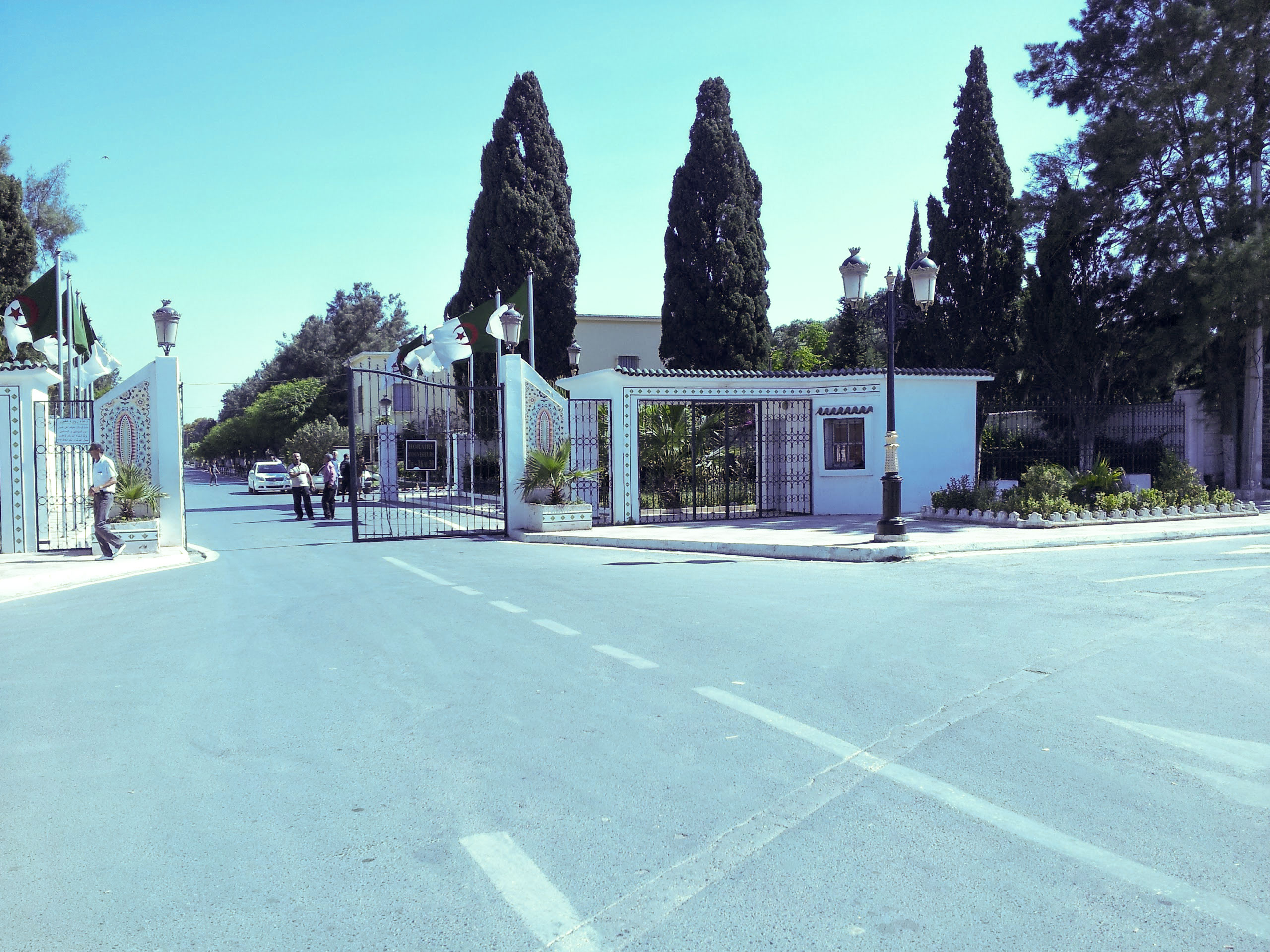
El Alia Cemetery

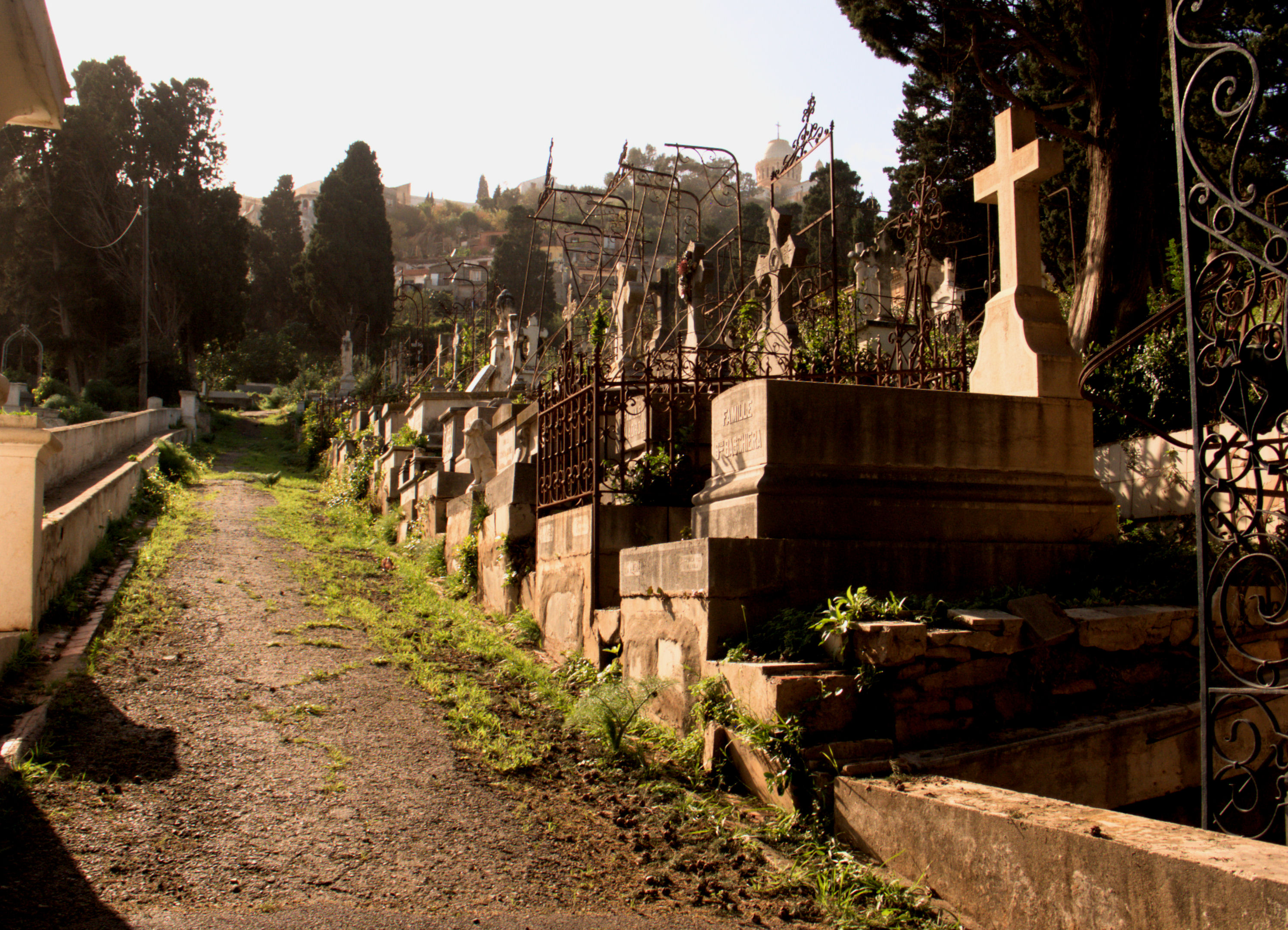
St. Eugene Cemetery

== See also ==
- Lists of cemeteries
- Ministry of Religious Affairs and Endowments
- Algiers Province
- Directorate of Religious Affairs and Endowments of Algiers
- Management of funerals and cemeteries of Algiers
