= Mohamed Bencheneb =

Algerian professor, writer and historian (1869–1929)

Mohamed Bencheneb (26 October 1869 – 5 February 1929) was an Algerian professor, writer and historian.

== Biography ==
Born in 1869 to parents of Turkish origin, Bencheneb became a teacher from 1889, mastering several languages, in addition to Arabic and French, he had learned Latin, English, Italian, Spanish, German, Persian and Turkish. Bencheneb taught at the Graduate School of Arts of Algiers before being sent in 1898 to a professorship at the Madrasas of Constantine where he remained for three years. He returned to Algiers in 1901 as a professor, taught since 1904 in Madrasa Thaalibia, and in 1908 was responsible for higher education conferences. He published several articles: one of his first articles was in the Revue Algerienne de Droit ("Journal of Algerian Law") in 1895, then in the Revue Africaine ("African Journal") where most of his articles were hosted.

After his death in 1929, he was buried in the Thaalibia Cemetery of the Casbah of Algiers.

== Bibliography ==
- Cheurfi, Achour (2001), La Classe Politique Algérienne (de 1900 à nos jours): Dictionnaire Biographique, University of Michigan, ISBN 9961-64-292-9.
- Déjeux, Jean (1984), "Bencheneb, Mohamed", Dictionnaire des Auteurs Maghrébins de Langue Française, Karthala, ISBN 2865370852.
- Oulebsir, Nabila (2004), "Bencheneb, Mohamed", Les usages du patrimoine: Monuments, musées et politique coloniale en Algérie, 1830-1930, Editions MSH, ISBN 2735110060.
