= St. Eugene Cemetery =

Coordinates: 36°47′57″N 3°02′47″E

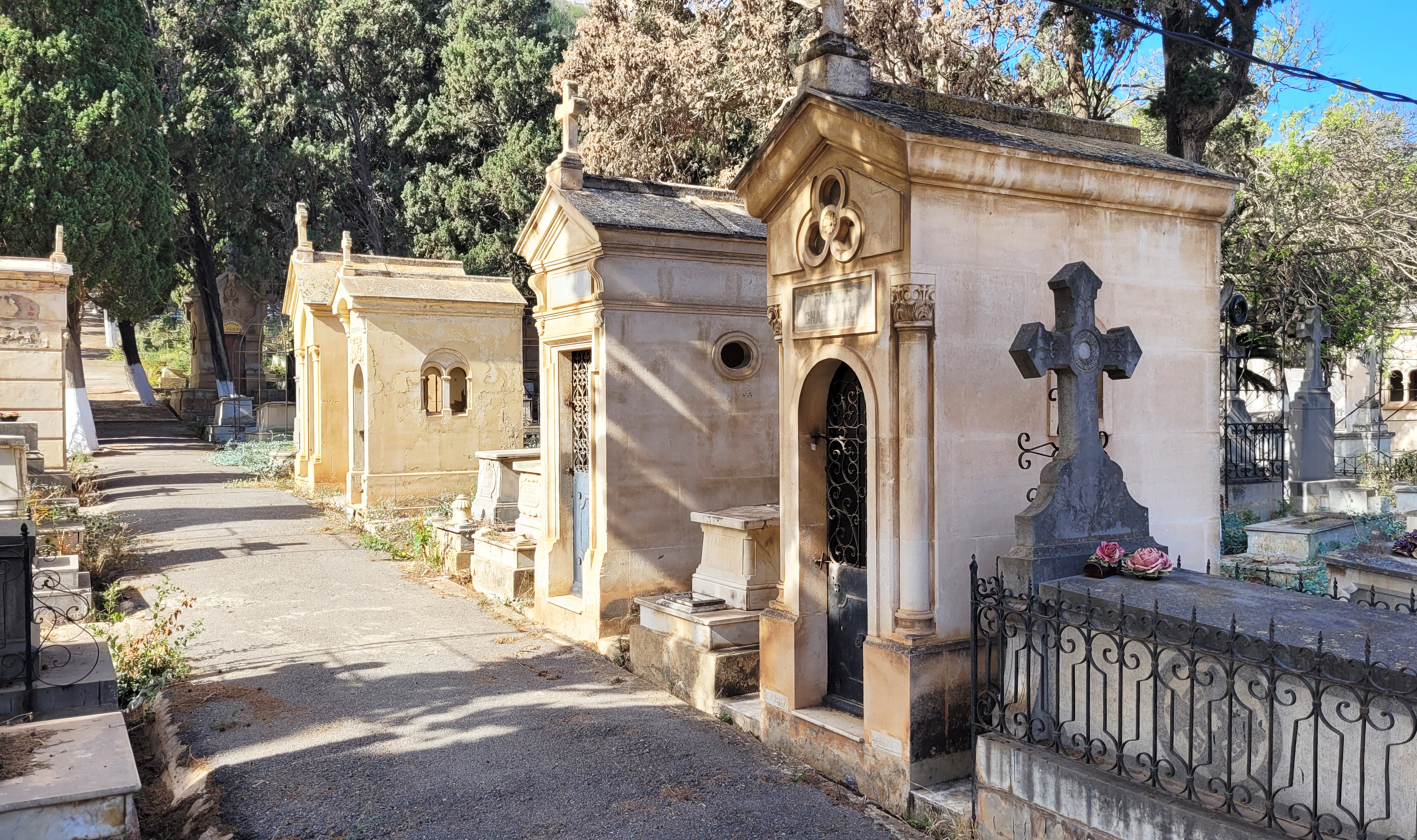
View of graves at St. Eugene

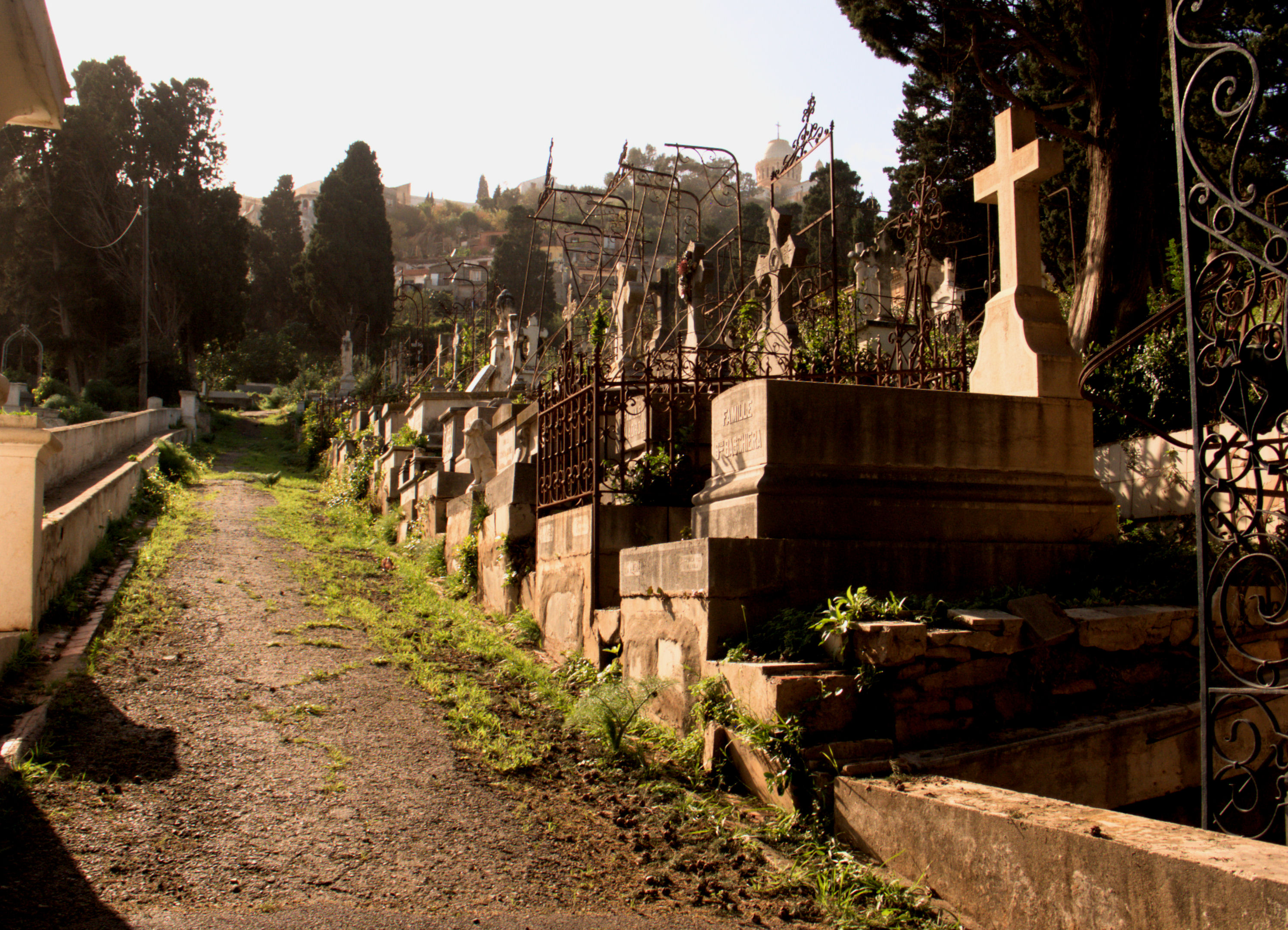
View of graves at St. Eugene, with the Notre Dame d'Afrique in the background. March 9th 2007.

St. Eugene Cemetery (Arabic: سانت يوجين مقبرة) is one of the most famous cemeteries in Algeria. It is situated in a suburb of the city of Algiers in the commune of Bologhine. Covering an area of 14.5 hectares, it lies at the foot of Notre Dame d'Afrique, and is maintained by twenty employees In 2012, the President of the French Republic François Hollande visited it.

It comprises tombs of numerous Algerian notables and it is one of the most preferred place for actors and actresses and other artists (opera singers, musicians, painters, sculptors, architects, writers, poets). It also includes the tombs of several scientists, academicians and sportspeople.

== Notable interments ==
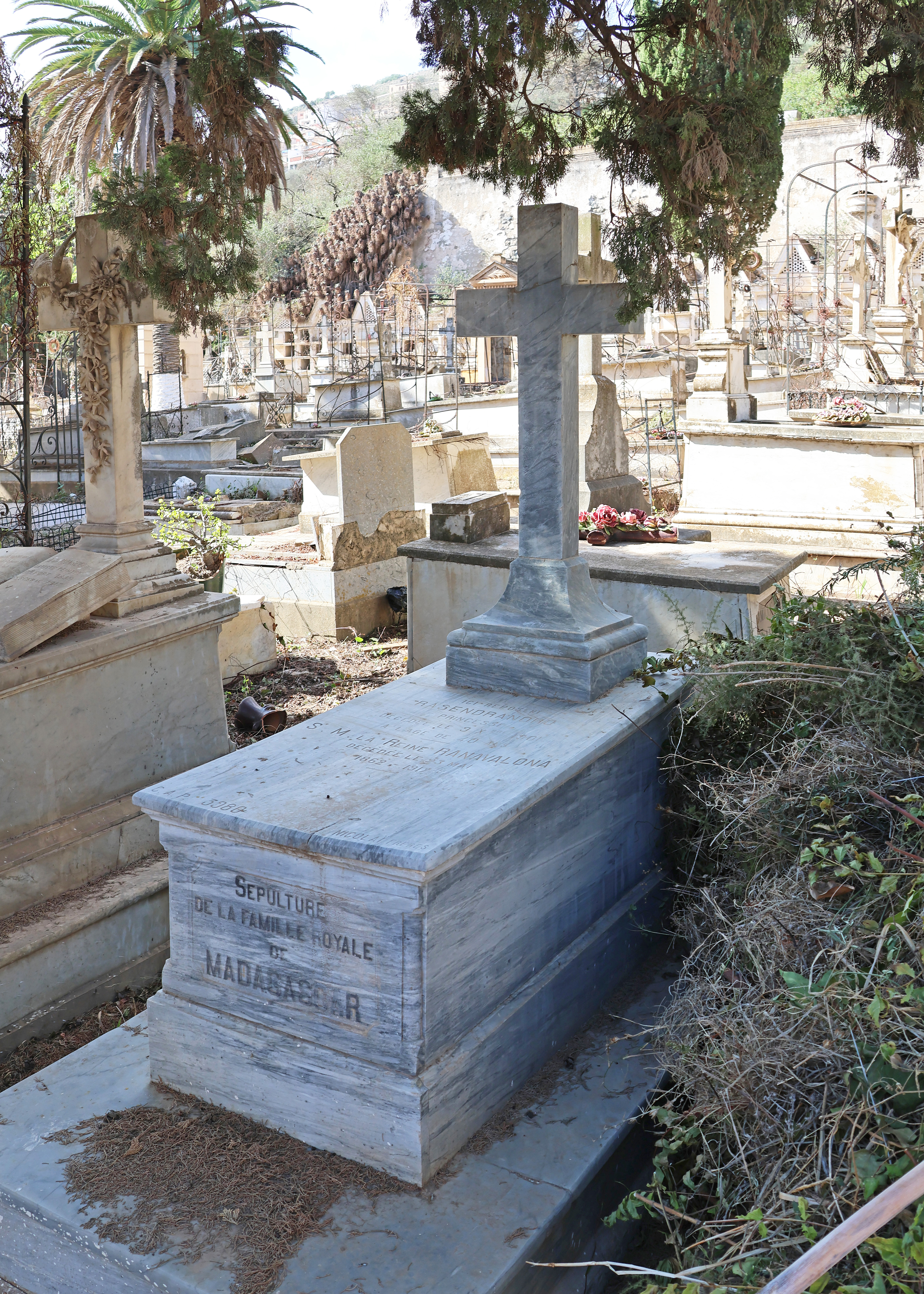
Tomb of Queen Ranavalona III

- Alexandre Fourchault
- Fernand Yveton
- 630 French soldiers in a military square of the two wars where the tombs are grouped into Army Corps specialties.
- Queen Ranavalona III. Her ashes were repatriated to Madagascar in 1938.
- Victims of the Isly street shooting.
- King Béhanzin of Dahomey, in 1906. However, his remains were repatriated in 1928.
- Alfred Pillafort, compagnon de la Libération.
- A monument is erected to the memory of the writer Louis Lecoq.
- Edmond Yafil
- Saül Durand a.k.a. Maalem Mouzino
- Roger Hanin

Note: This list is very far from complete: the number of notables buried here exceeds 10,000.

== See also ==
- Cemeteries of Algiers
