= Abdelhalim Bensmaia =

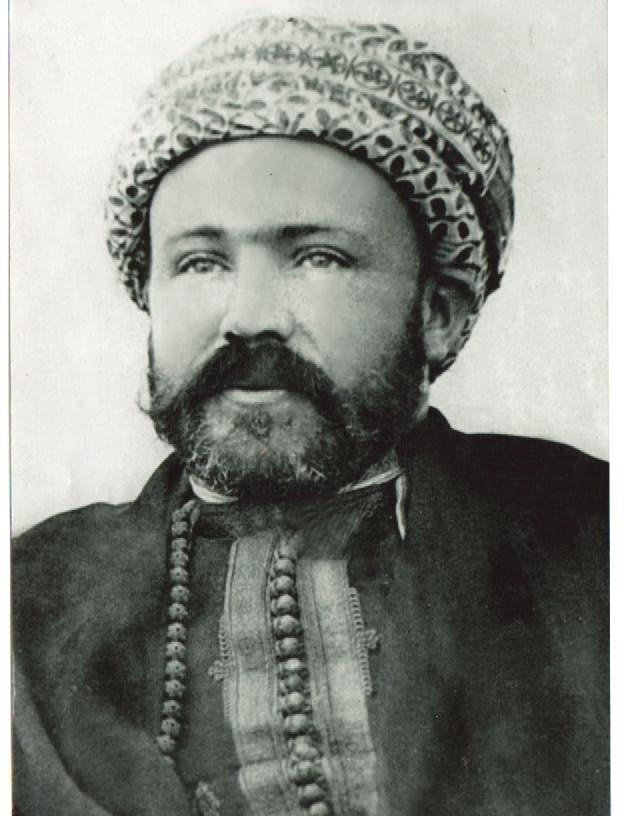
- Born: 1866; Algiers, French Algeria
- Died: 1933 (aged 66–67); Algiers, French Algeria

Abdelhalim Bensmaia (1866–1933) was a prominent Islamic scholar. He was also a reformist, humanist and musician.

== Personal life ==
Bensmaia was born in Algiers into a family of Turkish origin. His father, Ali Ben Abderrahmane Khodja, was the last mufti Malikite of Algiers. His nephew, Omar Bensmaia, was a prominent visual artist and successful tobacco merchant.

He taught in Madrasa Thaalibia since its inauguration in 17 october 1904.

After his death in 1933, he was buried in the Thaalibia Cemetery of the Casbah of Algiers.
