= Sidi M'hamed Bou Qobrine =

Algerian theologian and sufi (died 1790s)

- Muḥend Bu Qebrayen
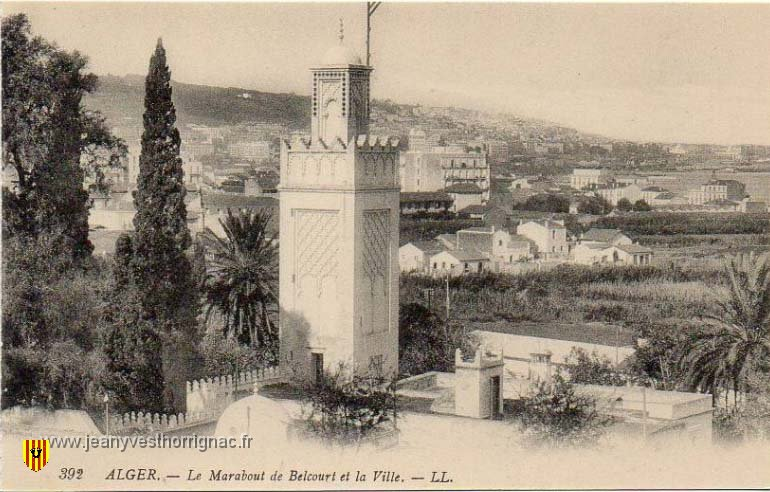
- Mausoleum of Sidi M'hamed Bou Qobrine

Personal life
- Born: Muḥend n Ɛebderreḥman Ayt Smail, Djurdjura, Kabylia
- Died: 1793/1794
- Resting place: Sidi M'hamed Bou Qobrine Cemetery
- Main interest(s): Sufism, Islamic jurisprudence
- Education: Al-Azhar University
- Known for: Founder of the Rahmaniyya Sufi order
- Occupation: Muslim scholar, Sufi saint

Religious life
- Religion: Islam
- Denomination: Sunnism
- School: Ash'ari

Muslim leader
- Post: Sheikh of the Rahmaniyya
- Period in office: 1774–1793
- Predecessor: Order established
- Successor: Mohamed Lamali
- Influenced by: Muhammad ibn Salim al-Hafnawi

Muhammad ibn Abd al-Rahman al-Gashtuli al-Jurjuri al-Azhari Abu Qabrayn (Kabyle: Muḥend n Ɛebderreḥman Leqšeṭuli Aǧerǧuri Aẓehri Bu Qebrayen, Arabic: محمد بن عبد الرحمن القشطولي الجرجري الأزهري بوقبرين; died in 1793/1794), mostly known as Sidi M'hamed Bou Qobrine (Kabyle: Muḥend Bu Qebrayen, Arabic: سيدي محمد بو قبرين) was an Algerian Kabyle ash'ari 'alim, founder of the Rahmaniyya Sufi order and is one of the seven Patron Saints of Algiers. The Sidi M'Hamed District in Algiers and the municipality of the same name, Sidi M'Hamed, are both named after him.

== Biography ==
Muhammad was born to the Berber Ayt Smail tribe of the Gashtula tribal confederation in the Djurdjura, Kabylie. After studying at his home, he went to Algiers to continue his studies. In 1740, he went to make the pilgrimage to Mecca. Returning from the pilgrimage, he stayed in Cairo, where he studied in the Al-Azhar madrasa. It was in this madrasa that he was initiated to the Khalwatiyya order under his teacher Muhammad ibn Salim al-Hafnawi. Under his teacher's orders, Muhammad started propagating the tariqa to India and the Sudan. After thirty years, he returned to Algeria, where he started preaching it among his people and founded a zawiya in his natal village.

He died in 1793/1794.

== See also ==
- Sidi M'hamed Bou Qobrine Cemetery
- List of Sufis
- List of Sufi saints
- Algerian Islamic reference
- Zaouïa de Bounouh
