= Amina Belouizdad =

Algerian television presenter

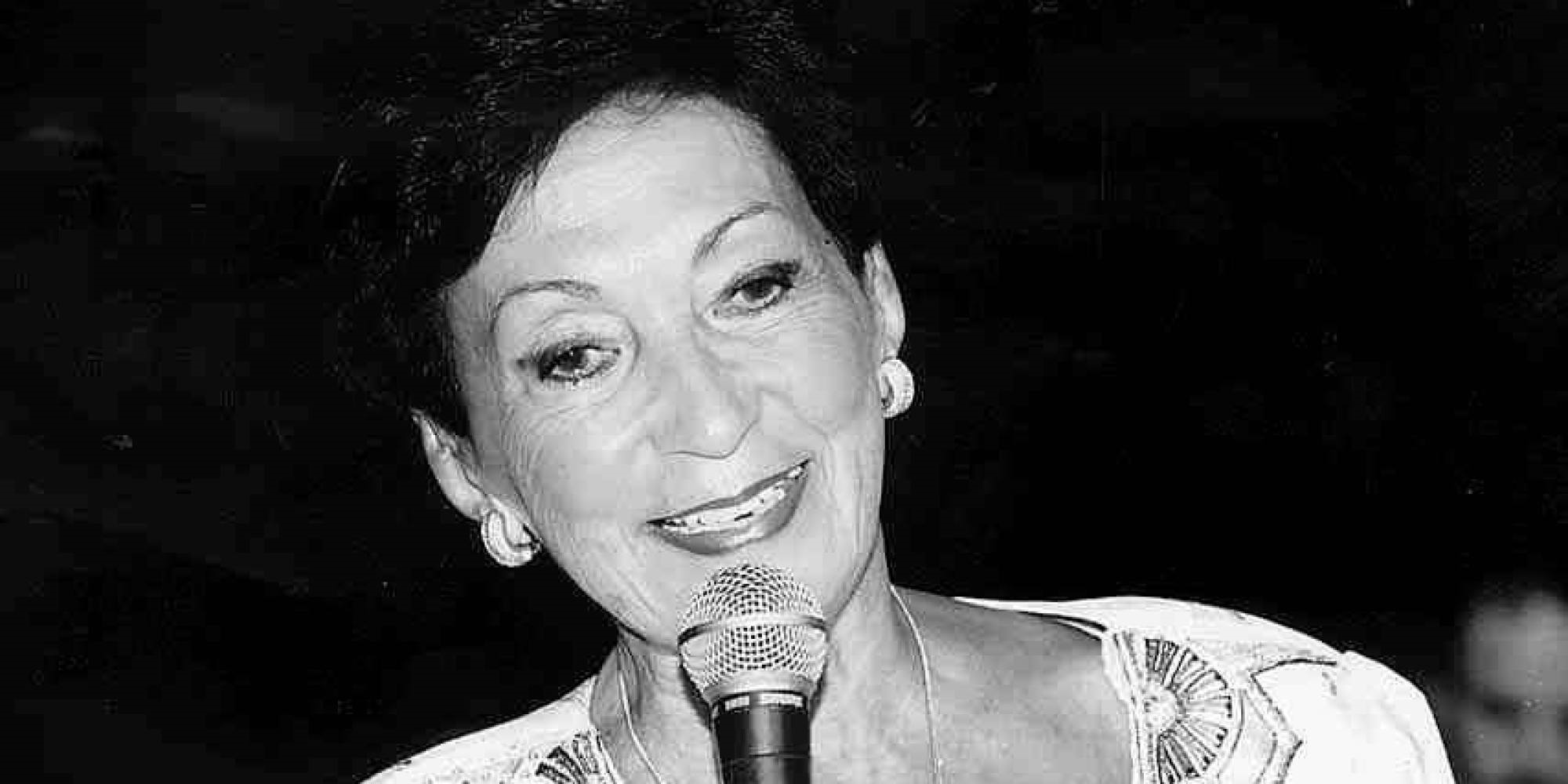
- Born: Rabia Ali-Chérif; 1931
- Died: 29 September 2015 (83 years)
- Resting place: Sidi M'hamed Bou Qobrine Cemetery
- Citizenship: Algeria
- Occupation: Television presenter
- Years active: 1962-1982
- Spouse: Belouizdad Mohamed
- Parents: Tahar Ali-Cherif (father); Maghnia Abed (mother)

Amina Belouizdad (1931 – 29 September 2015), born Rabia Ali-Chérif, was an Algerian journalist. She was the first female presenter on Algerian television.

At 18:00 on October 28, 1962, Belouizdad announced the birth of the Algerian Radio and Television (RTA) Channel, which replaced the French Radio and Television (RTF) Channel. She influenced generations of Algerians at a time when the RTA was the only available channel on television. Belouizdad retired in 1982.

== Life ==
Amina Belouizdad was born in 1931 in the neighbourhood of Belcourt (now Belouizdad) in Algiers.

Her father, Tahar Ali-Cherif, a lawyer by profession, was born in the Kasbah of Algiers, where his father had been installed to teach the Qu'ran before the end of the 19th Century. Tahar Ali-Cherif, fluent in three languages (Arabic, Kabyle and French) had the role of judiciary officer (defender of Muslim rights) and was devoted to writing and Classical Arabic Theatrical performances. He was also a founding member of the El Mossiliah Andalusian music school and managing executive of Mouloudia Club of Algiers.

Maghnia Abed, Amina Belouizdad's mother, was born in Chlef, and was the German cousin of the father of Hassiba Ben Bouali, herself a martyr of the Algerian Revolution and an adopted daughter of Belcourt (now Belouizdad).

In 1947, Belouizdad married Belouizdad Mohamed, cousin of the nationalist militant Mohamed Belouizdad, whom the neighbourhood is named after. She has had three sons, whom she raised to university level.

== Career ==
Prior to the Algerian revolution, Amina was expected to fulfil her duties as a wife and mother as dictated by Algerian traditions and customs. However, in order to supplement the family income, she accepted an offer of employment in 1958 from the French Radio and Television (RTF) channel looking for a television presenter. As a fluently bilingual native, she was hired for the position, also adopting the name "Amina" as it was considered to be more phonetically accessible to a French audience than the name "Rabia".

At the beginning of the Algerian revolution, she devoted herself to supporting wives of imprisoned activists by organizing fundraising. In 1958, she became a bilingual presenter at RTF. She took advantage of her celebrity status to drive her car across military checkpoints to meet militants who, with the help of her husband, stayed in their homes before joining the Maquis. One of these militants was Cherif El Hachemi, a colleague at the RTF.

Amina continued her career as a television presenter up until her retirement in 1982. Despite her retirement, her popularity ensured so that she would continue to be a reference on cultural matters, especially with regard to Chaabi and Andalusian music which she was very passionate about.

== Death ==
Amina Belouizdad died 29 September 2015 at the age of 83 following a stroke. She was buried with the honours of the Republic in the cemetery of Sidi M'hamed in her native district.

Her last home is between those of her parents, that of Mohamed Belouizdad and that of Hassiba Ben Bouali.
