= Thaalibia Quran =

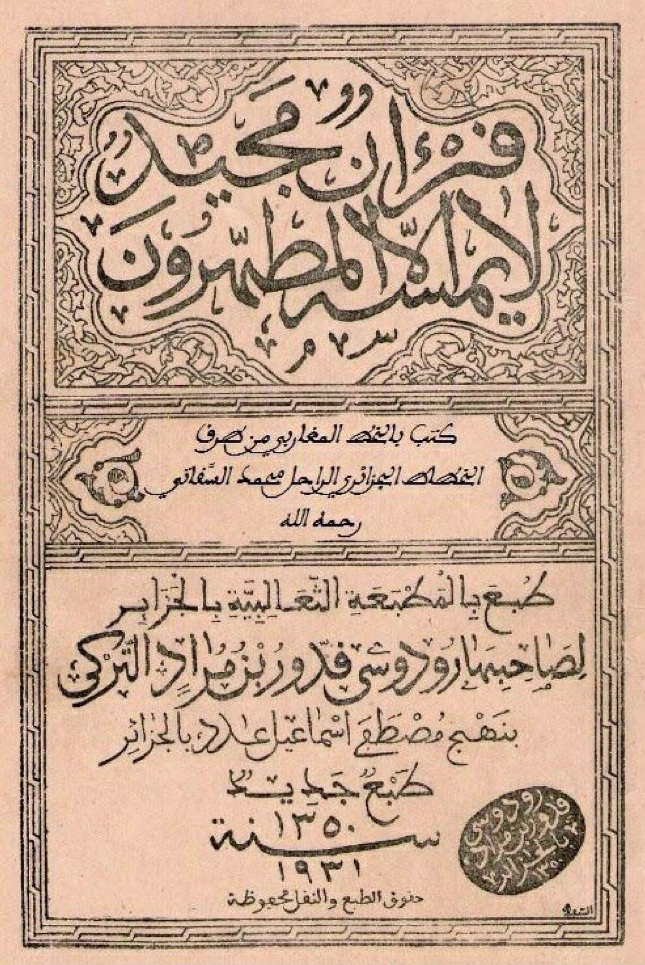
- The front (first) page of Thaalibia Quran
- Original title: مصحف المطبعة الثعالبية
- Illustrator: Ahmed Mansali, Omar Racim, Mohamed Cherradi
- Language: Arabic
- Genre: Quranic mushaf
- Publisher: Thaalibia Publishing
- Publication date: 1905, 1907, 1912, 1931, 1937, 1962-1971
- Publication place: Algeria
- Pages: 622 (1912 edition); 666 (1931 edition); 718 (1937 edition)

The Thaalibia Quran is a mushaf (Quranic manuscript) written in Algeria in the Maghrebi script.

== Manuscript description ==
The transcription of this mushaf was done in accordance with the Warsh recitation, which is the main canonical qirāʼah, or method of reciting the Qur'an, practiced in North Africa.

Since 1895, the two brothers Kaddour Rodosi and Ali Rodosi made this initiative to publish a Warsh mushaf through their publishing house, Thaalibia Publishing.

== Editions ==
The printed copy of this Quran Mus'haf followed several editions.

The 1905 edition Mus'haf was first published by the Thaalibia Publishing in 1905 in a full version. The manuscript was written by Ahmed Mansali.

The 1907 edition was edited by the same publisher. The manuscript of this edition of the Mus'haf was written by Omar Racim (1884–1959).

The manuscript of 1912 edition was written by Mohamed Cherradi, who was also responsible for the 1931 edition. and 1937 edition.

The 1937 Mus'haf was also divided in four quarters printed separately:

1. First quarter, from Al-Fatiha to Al-An'am.
2. Second quarter, from Al-A'raf to Al-Kahf.
3. Third quarter, from Maryam to Fatir.
4. Fourth quarter, from Ya-Sin to Al-Nas.

The Thaalibia Quran was reproduced by independent Algeria from 1962 until 1971 in a full version.

The idea of realizing the Algeria Quran was then born and concretised in 1979 with the participation of the illustrator Mohamed Cherifi.

== Gallery ==
=== 1931 edition ===
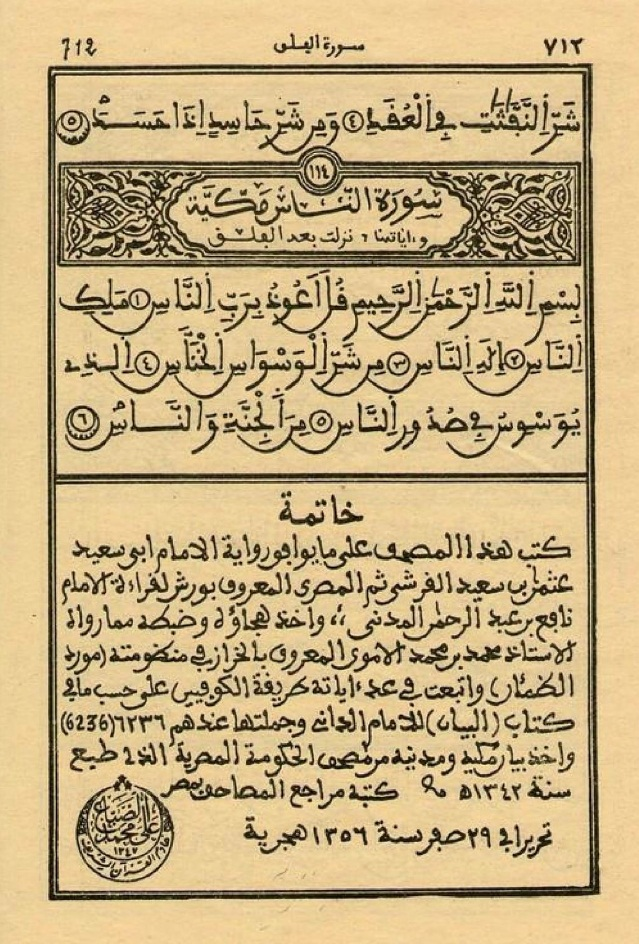
End of Thaalibia Mus'haf.

== See also ==
- Islam in Algeria
- Algeria Quran
- Ten recitations
- Warsh recitation
