= Saïda Sassi =

Tunisian politician (1921–2007)

- Born: 1921; Monastir
- Died: 25 July 2007 (aged 85–86)
- Occupation: Politician
- Known for: Tunisian independence and emancipation of women
- Relatives: Habib Bourguiba (uncle)

Saïda Sassi (1921 – 25 July 2007) was a Tunisian politician. She was a key associate of her uncle President Habib Bourguiba during his tenure from 1957 to 1987.

== Early life ==
Saïda Sassi was born in 1921 in Monastir. She was orphaned at age six and raised by her uncle, Habib Bourguiba. Unable to invest in her studies, she obtained only a study certificate.

After the independence of Tunisia and the accession of her uncle to the presidency of the Republic, she entered Carthage Palace because Bourguiba asked her to live there with her husband. She quickly assumed important functions and was responsible for monitoring the health of the president.

== Career ==
Sassi was a pioneer in the struggle for the independence of Tunisia and for the emancipation of women.

With her arrival in Carthage, she became a pillar of the presidential palace and succeeded in influencing her uncle, President Bourguiba. Her role was to ensure his safety; for over thirty years, she even slept next to his bed.

She was considered a source of political conspiracies. She was responsible for maintaining her uncle's image by informing Tunisians that the president was more resistant than the media would admit.

== Private life ==
=== Relationship with Habib Bourguiba ===
She had strong ties with the president and played an ambiguous role in the presidential palace. She allowed herself to interfere in the president's sexual life by recruiting women for him.

Bourguiba devoted time to her and spent his days in her company, after meetings with political figures. After he was dismissed in 1987 for senility by Prime Minister Zine el-Abidine Ben Ali, Bourguiba left power and was transferred to the state residence of Mornag. Sassi remained loyal to him and continued to visit him until she moved to Paris.

=== Relationship with Wassila Bourguiba ===
Sassi's relationship with the First Lady and second wife of the President, Wassila Bourguiba, was tense since Sassi had the right to sleep at her uncle's bedside and had a say in his affairs, while Wassila was sidelined. The rivalry ended in 1986 with the divorce of Habib and Wassila.

=== End of life ===
A year after Bourguiba left power in 1987, Sassi settled in Paris. In 1995, she discovered that she had Alzheimer's disease. She then returned to her native country and ended her days there, dying on 25 July 2007. Her funeral at the Jellaz Cemetery was sparsely attended, mainly by relatives and friends.
