= Sidi M'hamed Bou Qobrine Cemetery =

Cemetery in Belouizdad, Algeria

- مقبرة سيدي أمحمد بوقبرين مقبرة الحامة - مقبرة بلوزداد
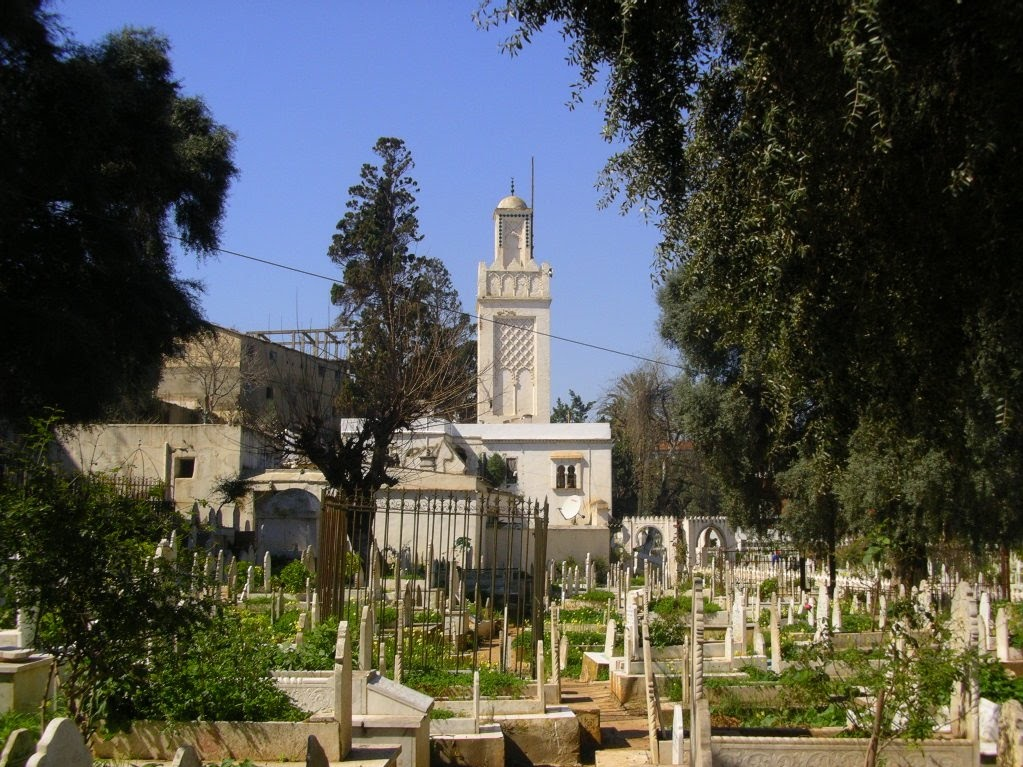
- Sidi M'hamed Bou Qobrine Cemetery
- Interactive map of Sidi M'hamed Bou Qobrine Cemetery

Details
- Location: Belouizdad
- Country: Algeria
- Coordinates: 36.7501885°N 3.065305°E
- Type: Islamic Cemetery
- Style: Moorish
- Owned by: Waqf
- Size: 2 hectares

Sidi M'hamed Bou Qobrine Cemetery (Arabic: مقبرة سيدي أمحمد بوقبرين) is a cemetery in the commune of Belouizdad in Algeria. The name relates to Sidi M'hamed Bou Qobrine.

== History ==
In the place of this Muslim cemetery, in 1830 during the French conquest of Algeria, there was only the mausoleum of Sidi M'hamed Bou Qobrine and a few graves among the wild olive trees.

It was then that the burials of the Muslim dead in Algiers were more and more numerous in the El Kettar cemetery from 1834, and in the Sidi M'hamed Cemetery.

The latter began to be a Muslim necropolis only around 1850, when the cemeteries occupying the site of the streets of Tripoli, Larbi Ben Mhidi, Ali Boumendjel and Boulevard Debbih Cherif were destroyed.

Originally surrounded by cacti and aloe vera, a perimeter wall was built to surrounded it at the start of the 20th century.

The entrance gate, the minaret, the portico and the fountain were also built at this time.

== Notable interments ==
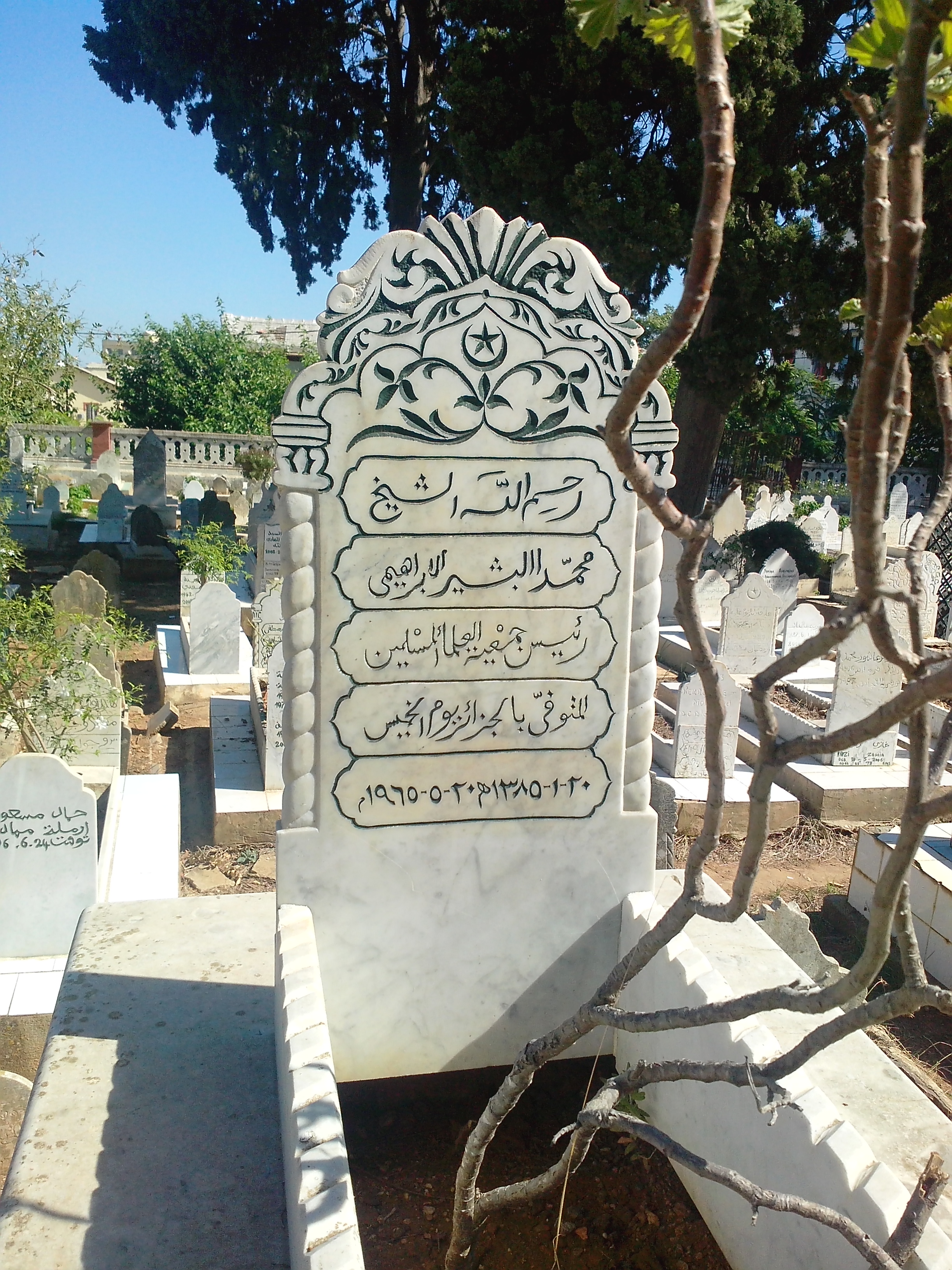
Tomb of Mohamed Bachir El Ibrahimi

- Sidi M'hamed Bou Qobrine
- Abderrahmane Djilali
- Ahmed Senhadji
- Aïssat Idir
- Ali Boumendjel
- Amina Belouizdad
- Hassiba Ben Bouali
- Larbi Zekkal
- Madani Abbassi
- Malek Bennabi
- Mohamed Bachir El Ibrahimi
- Mohamed Belouizdad
- Mohamed Lefkir
- Zoubir Bouadjadj

== Gallery ==
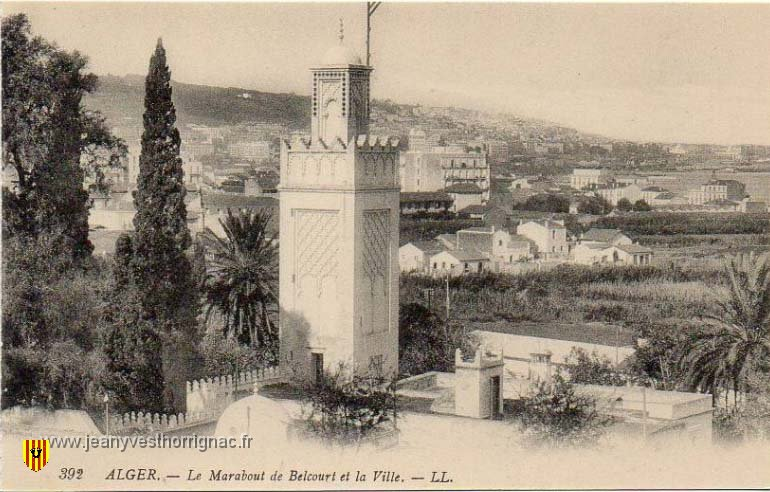
Zawiyet Sidi M'hamed Bou Qobrine

== See also ==
- Cemeteries of Algiers
