= Thaalibia Cemetery =

Cemetery in Algeria

- المقبرة الثعالبية مقبرة سيدي عبد الرحمان الثعالبي
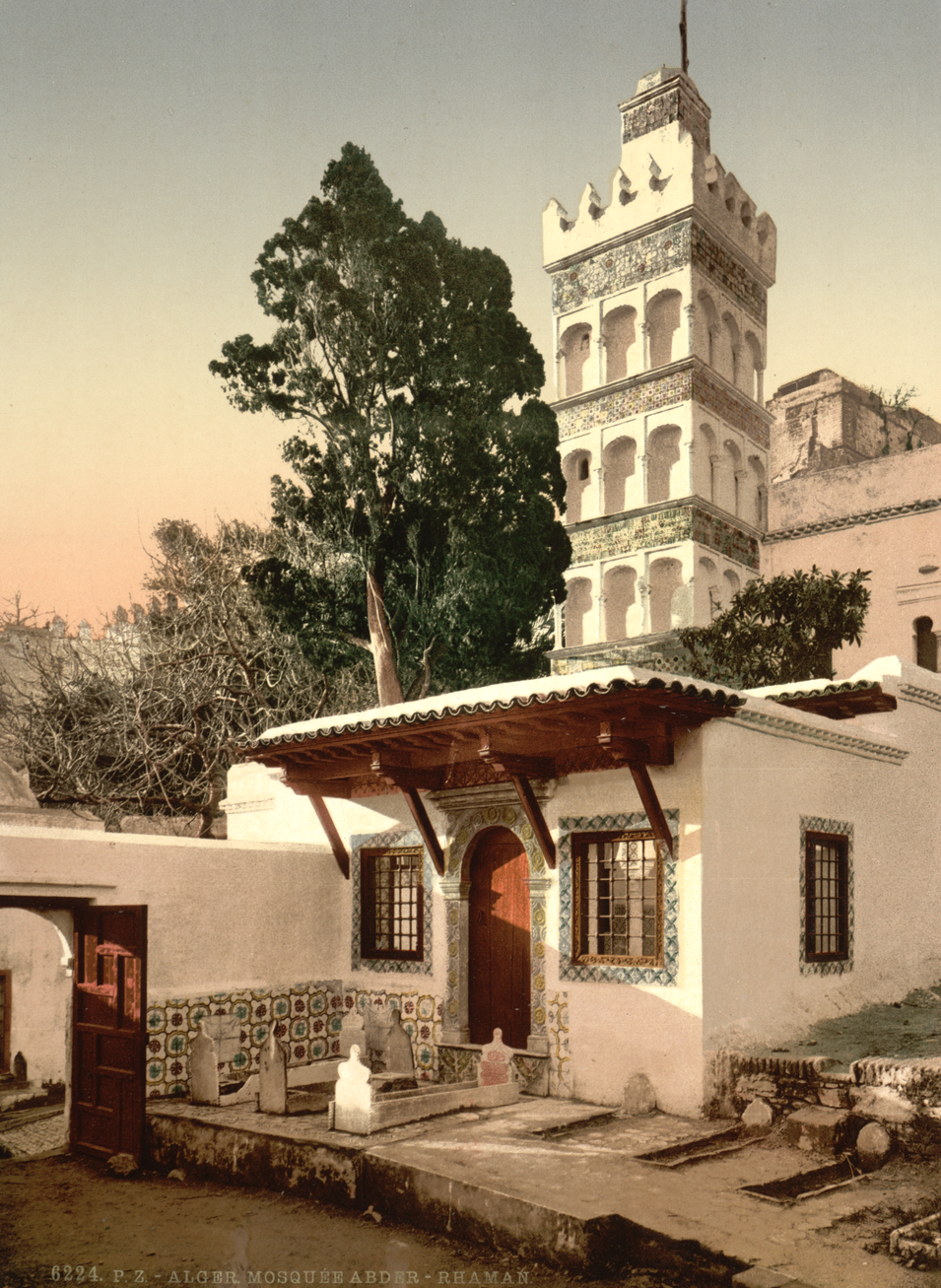
- Thaalibia Cemetery
- Interactive map of Thaalibia Cemetery

Details
- Location: Casbah of Algiers
- Country: Algeria
- Coordinates: 36.7884592°N 3.05956°E
- Type: Muslim cemetery
- Style: Moorish
- Owned by: Waqf
- Size: 1 hectare

Thaalibia Cemetery (Arabic: المقبرة الثعالبية) or Abd al-Rahman al-Tha'alibi Cemetery (Arabic: مقبرة سيدي عبد الرحمان الثعالبي) is a cemetery in the Casbah of Algiers in the commune of the Casbah of Algiers. The name "Thaalibia" is related to Abd al-Rahman al-Tha'alibi.

== History ==
This Islamic cemetery was founded in 1490 within the Casbah of Algiers, and comprises tombs of numerous Algerian theologians and notables.

It is located in the historical Zawiya Thaalibia, near the Thaalibi Mosque and the Mausoleum of Sidi Abderrahmane Et-Thaalibi.

== Notable interments ==
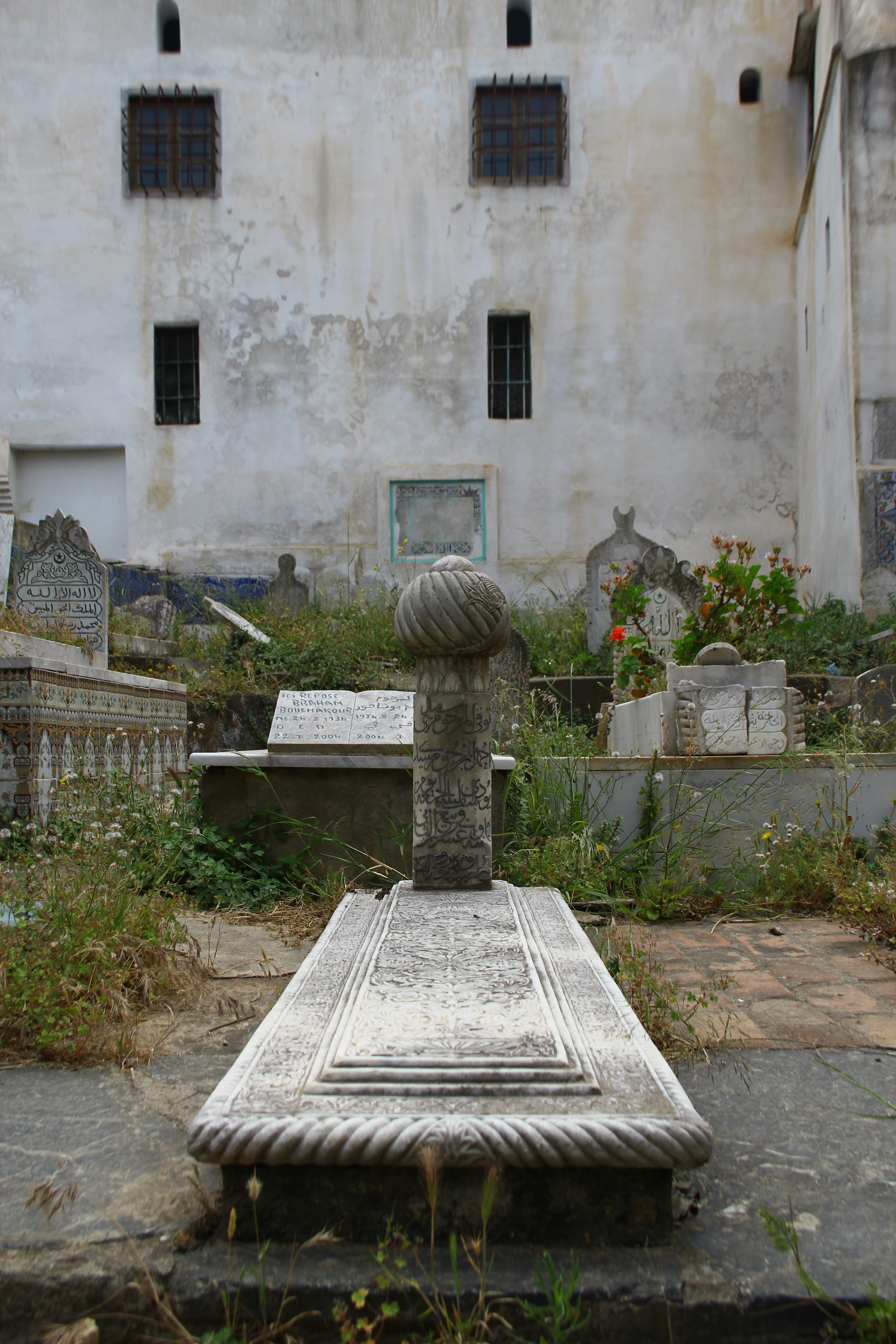
Tombs in Thaalibia Cemetery

- Abd al-Rahman al-Tha'alibi
- Abdelhalim Bensmaia
- Abu Yaala az-Zawawi
- Ahmed Bey ben Mohamed Chérif
- Ali Ammali
- Ali Ben El-Haffaf
- Ali Khodja
- Boudjemaa Maknassi
- H'mida Ammali
- Khidr Pasha
- Mohamed Ammali
- Mohamed Bencheneb
- Mohamed Mechati
- Mohammed Racim
- Mustafa Pasha
- Omar Agha
- Omar Racim
- Ouali Dada
- Sidi Abd Youssef
- Sidi Abdallah
- Sidi Betqa
- Sidi Bougdour
- Sidi Flih
- Sidi Hassan
- Sidi Mansour
- Sidi Ouadah
- Youssef Pacha

== Gallery ==
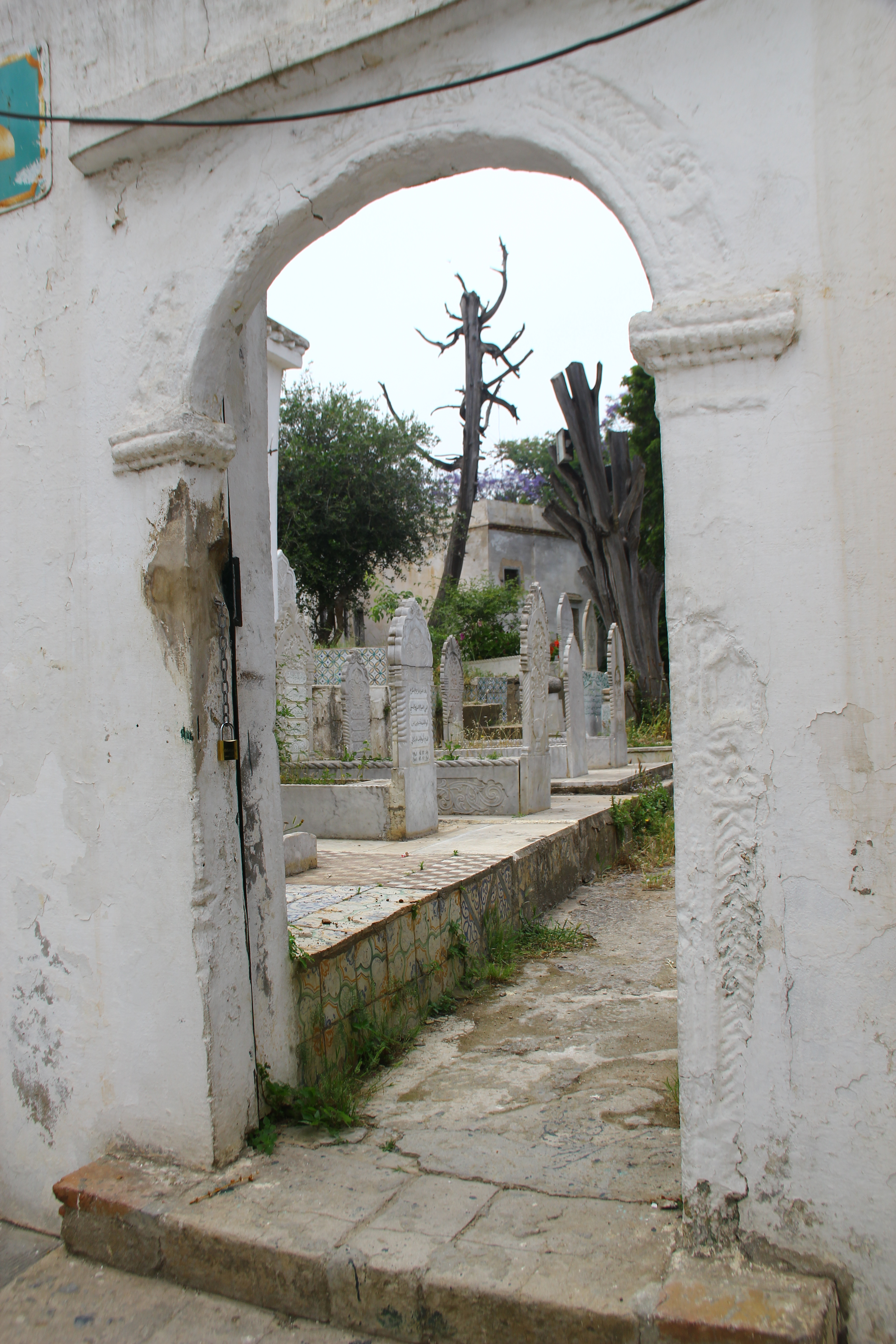
Tombs in Thaalibia Cemetery

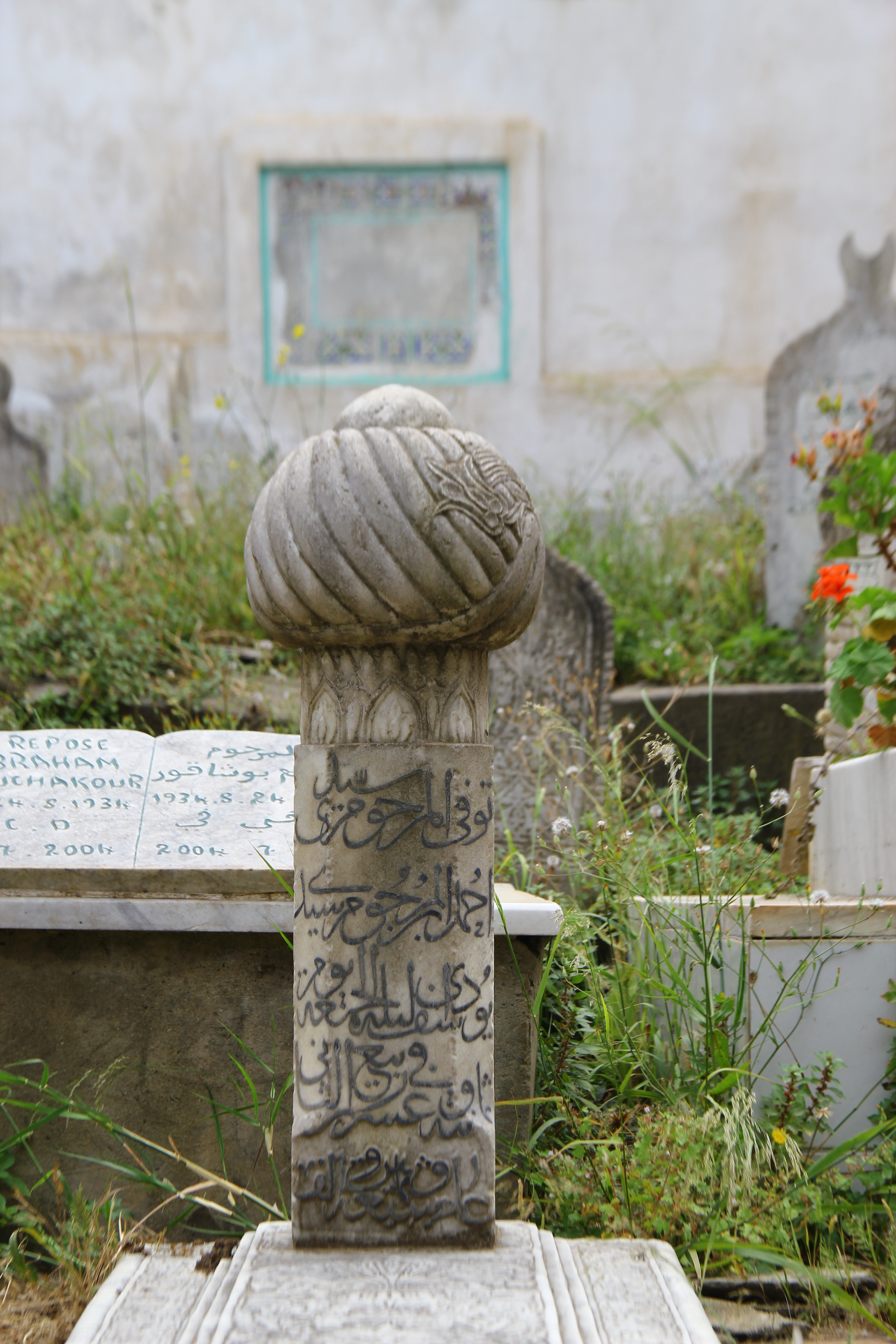
Tombs in Thaalibia Cemetery

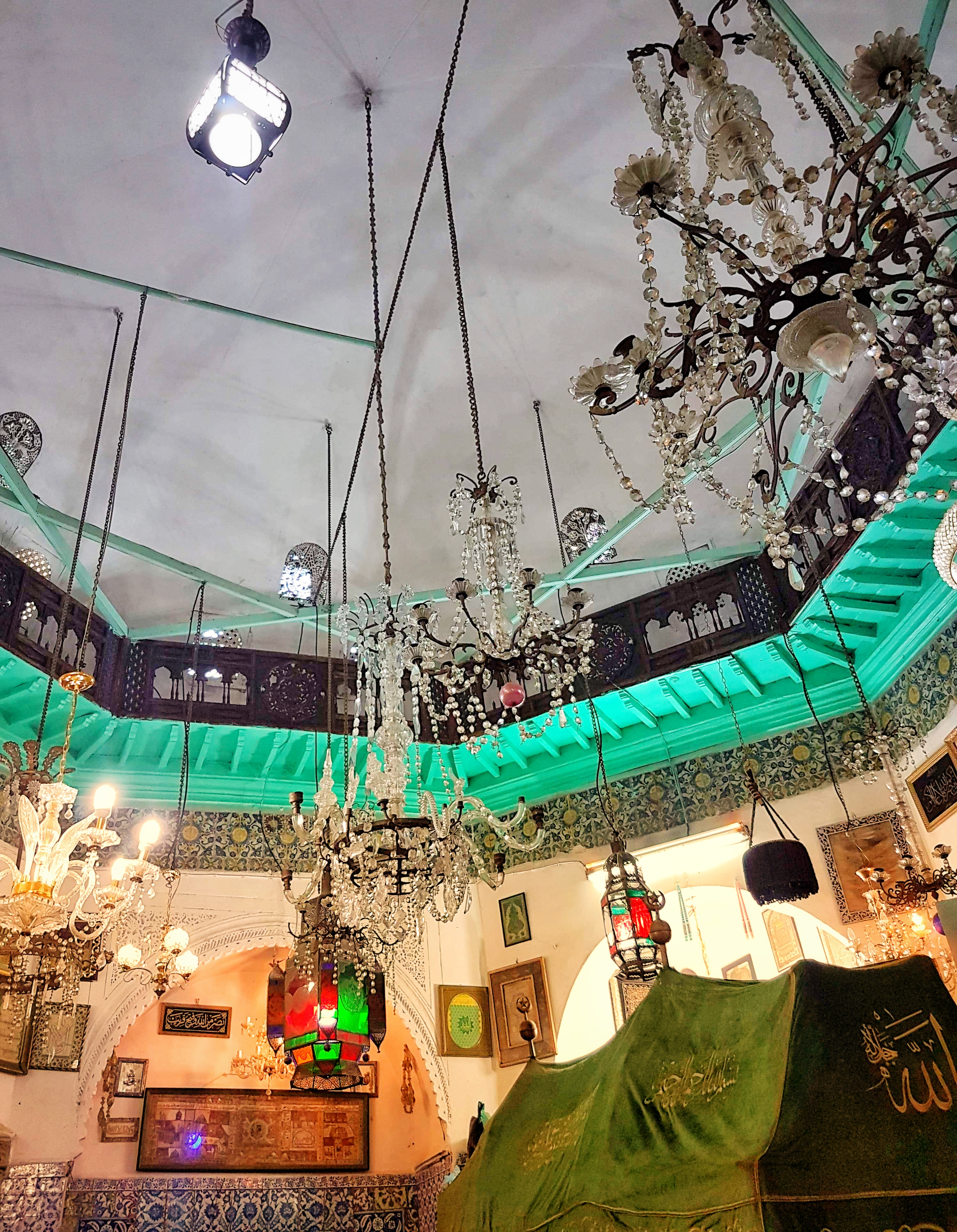
Mausoleum of Sidi Abderrahmane Et-Thaalibi

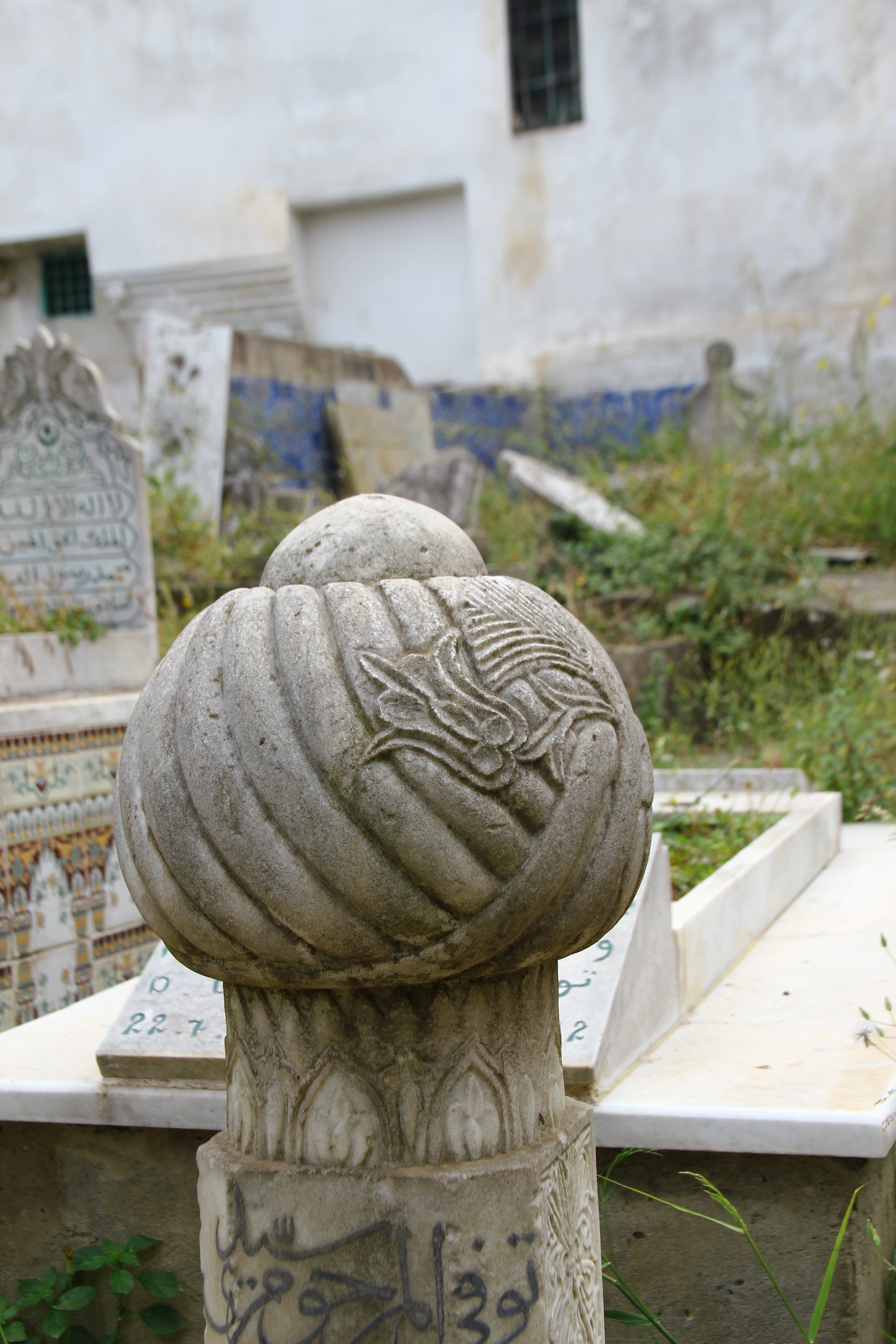
Tombs in Thaalibia Cemetery

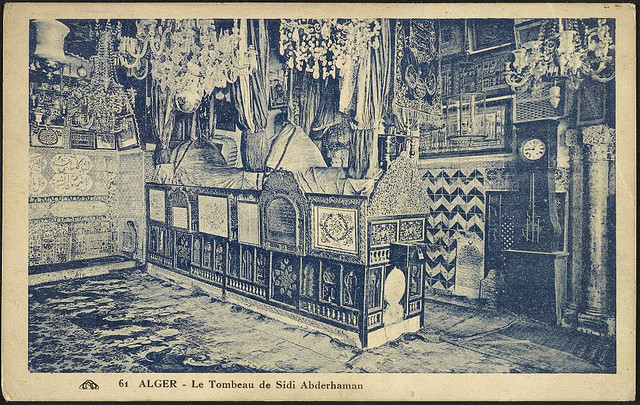
Mausoleum of Sidi Abderrahmane Et-Thaalibi

== See also ==
- Cemeteries of Algiers
