= Madrasa Thaalibia =

Madrasa in Algiers, Algeria

- المدرسة الثعالبية
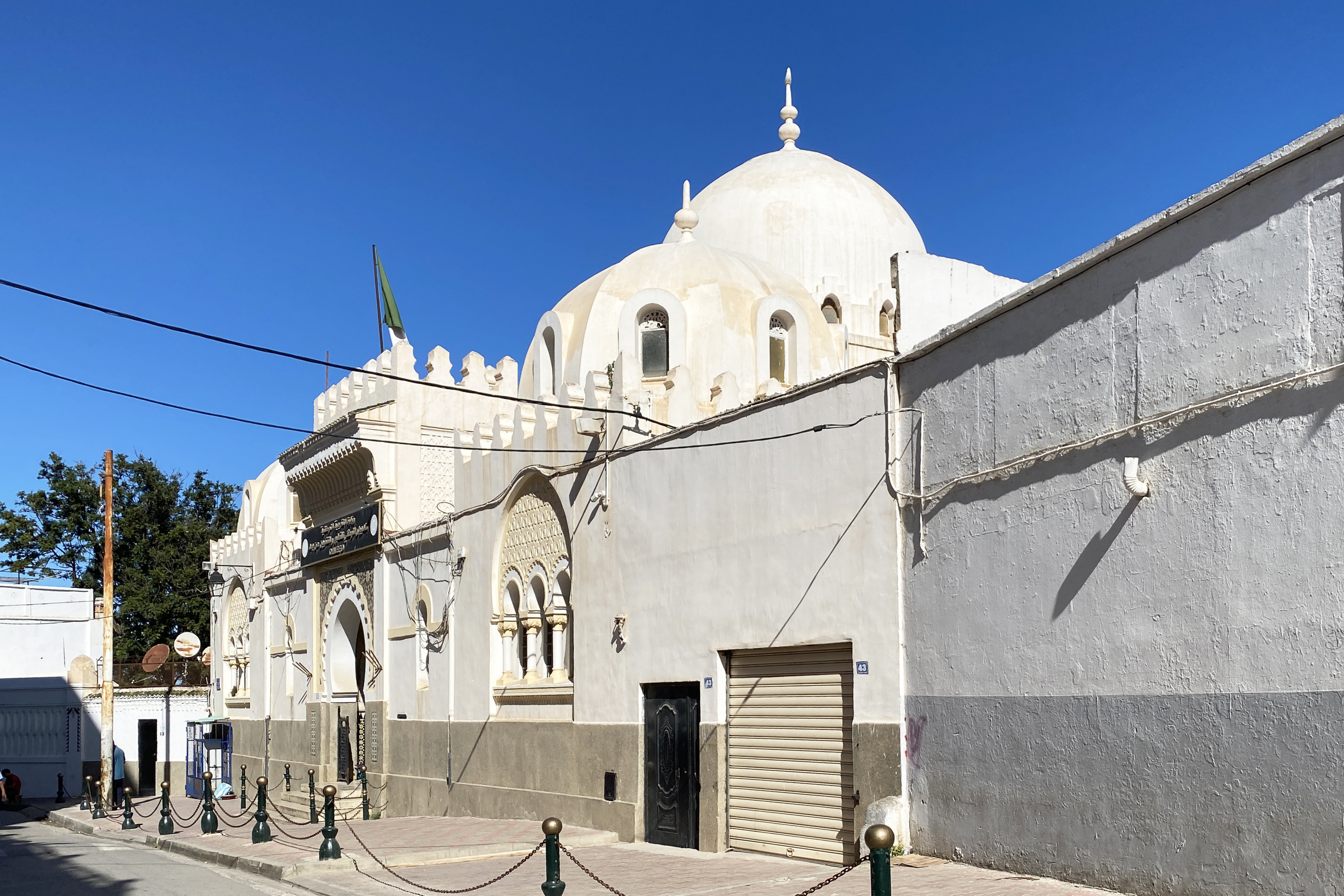

Location
- Casbah, Algiers; Algeria
- 36.7880259°N 3.059713°E

Information
- Type: Madrasa
- Established: October 17, 1904
- Founder: Charles Jonnart
- Closed: 1954
- Head teacher: Ahmed Ben Zekri
- Language: Arabic, French

The Madrasa Thaalibia (Arabic: المدرسة الثعالبية; French: Médersa Thaâlibiyya), is a madrasa located in Algiers, Algeria. It was founded on 17 October 1904 by Charles Jonnart and subsequently became one of the leading spiritual and educational centres of Algeria.

== Architecture ==
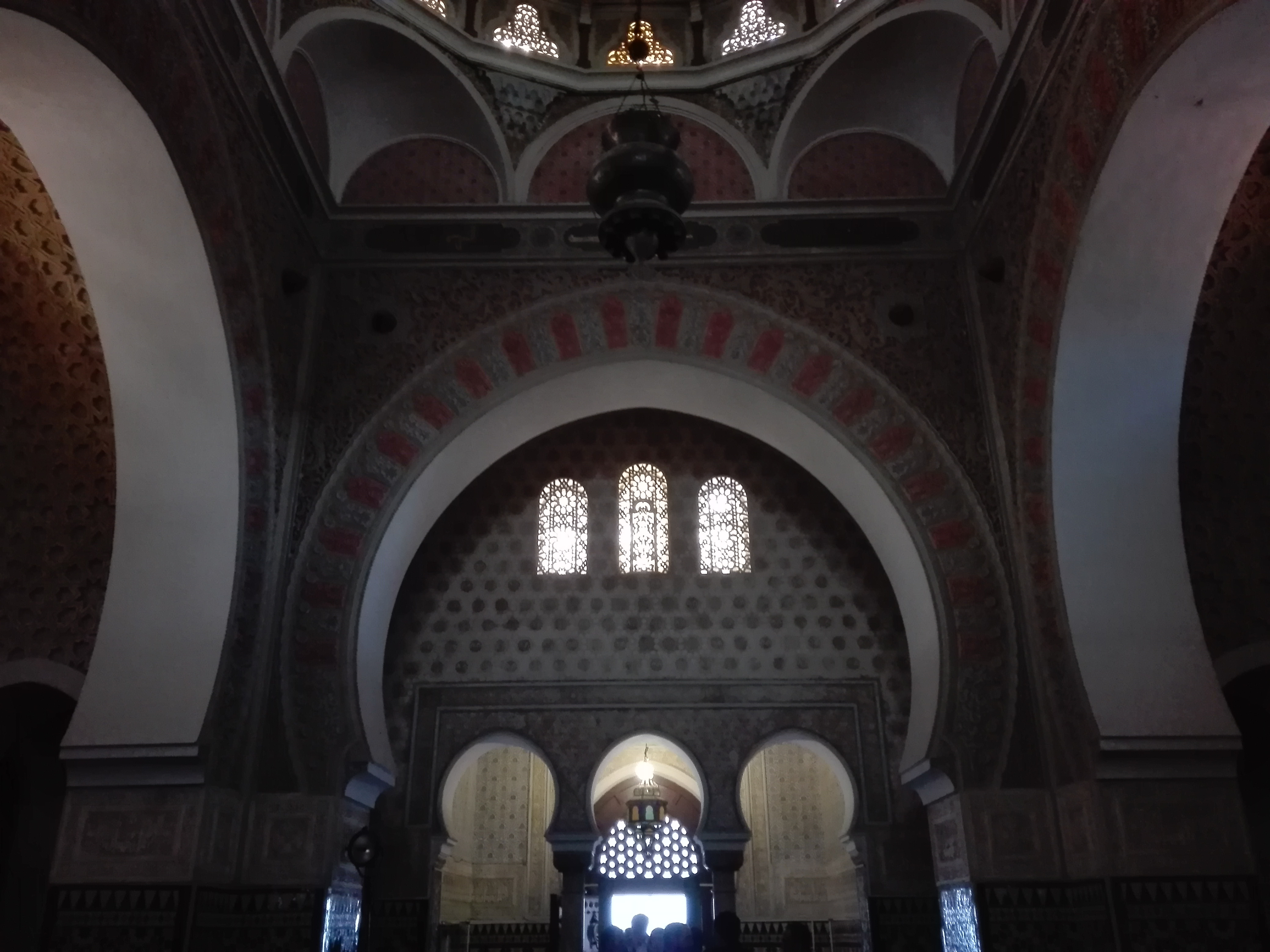
Madrasa

The building of this madrasa was designed by the architect Henri Petit (1856–1926). The style followed the Moorish Revival architecture under the guidance of Jonnart,

Four domes flank the central dome, a vestibule and a porch open between the two domes of the main façade. All the walls are lined, halfway up, with paneled earthenware faience and tiles.

For about fifty years since 1954, the building no longer has its vocation as a higher establishment for Medersians.

== Teachers ==
- Abdelhalim Bensmaia
- Mohamed Bencheneb
- Abdelkader Medjaoui
- Ali Ammali
- Belkacem Hafnaoui
- Abderrazak Ashraf
- Mohamed Saïd Ben Zekri

== Students ==
- Omar Racim
- Si Kaddour Benghabrit
- Abderrahmane Djilali
- Noureddine Abdelkader

== See also ==
- Charles Jonnart
