= Sidi Garidi Cemetery =

- مقبرة سيدي قاريدي مقبرة القبة
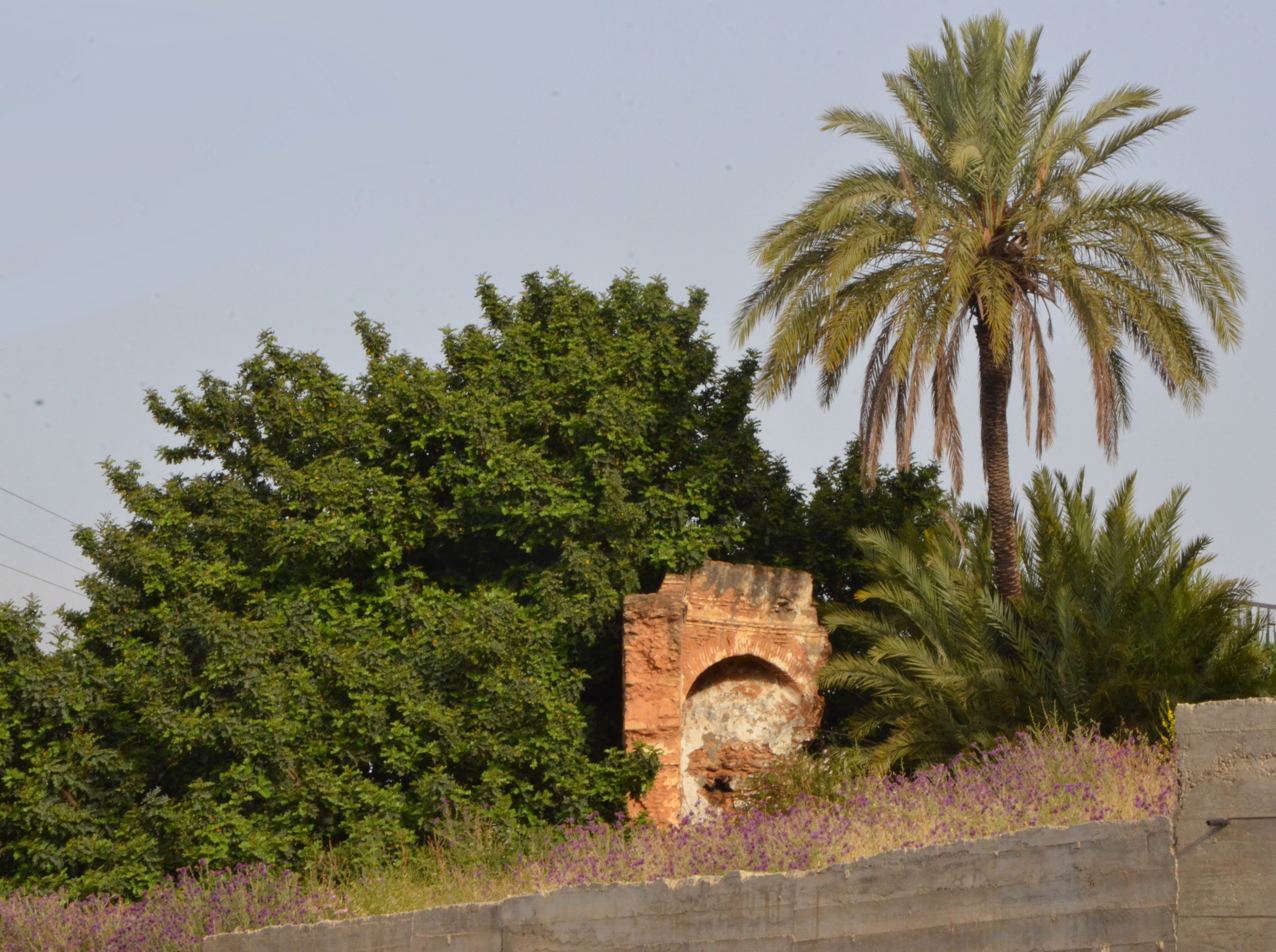
- Sidi Garidi Mausoleum
- Interactive map of Sidi Garidi Cemetery

Details
- Location: Kouba
- Country: Algeria
- Coordinates: 36.7501885°N 3.065305°E
- Type: Islamic Cemetery
- Style: Moorish
- Owned by: Waqf
- Size: 3 hectares

Sidi Garidi Cemetery (Arabic: مقبرة سيدي قاريدي) is a cemetery in the commune of Kouba in Algeria. The name related to Sidi Garidi.

== Notable interments ==
- Sidi Garidi
- Abdelali Farah
- Abdelhak Benamar
- Abdelhamid Daimallah
- Abdelkarim Djilali
- Abdelwahab Hakki
- Abderrachid Boukerzaza
- Abderrahmane Zakad
- Ali Farah
- Bachir Hammadi
- Brahim Boushaki
- Djameledine Bessou
- Djilali Aït Chegou
- Fawzi Rouzeik
- Hacène Lalmas
- Hafnaoui Zaghez
- Hassan Ouaadia
- Laïfa Ouyahia
- M'hamed Talbi
- Mahboub Bati
- Mahfoud Benalouane
- Mohamed Abid
- Mohamed Boulifa
- Mohamed Missouri
- Mohamed Salah
- Mourad Kadi
- Nabil Hemani
- Nouria Kazdarli
- Rachid Farès
- Salah Djenouhat
- Slimane Benaziez
- Tahar Mezghiche

== See also ==
- Cemeteries of Algiers
