= Zawiya Thaalibia (Algiers) =

- الزاوية الثعالبية
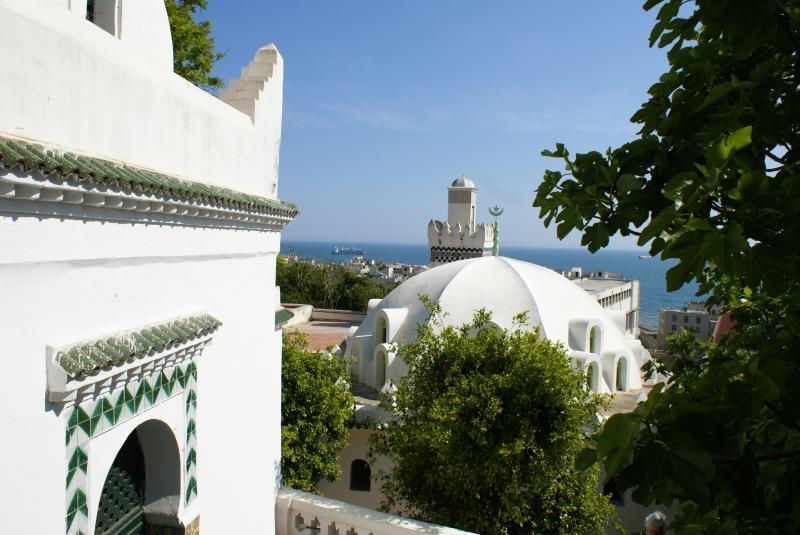
- Zawiya Thaalibia
- Other name: زاوية سيدي عبد الرحمن الثعالبي
- Former name: زاوية قصبة الجزائر
- Type: Zawiya
- Established: 1460 CE / 864 AH
- Founder: Sidi Abd al-Rahman al-Tha'alibi
- Affiliations: Ministry of Religious Affairs and Endowments
- Religious affiliation: Qadiriyya, Rahmaniyya
- Location: Casbah of Algiers, Algiers, Kabylia, Mitidja, Algiers Province, 16022, Algeria; 36.7884592°N 3.05956°E
- Language: Arabic, Berber
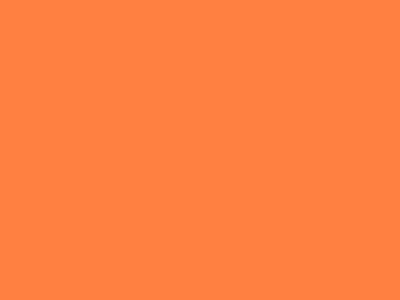

The Zawiya Thaalibia (Arabic: الزاوية الثعالبية) or the Sidi Abd al-Rahman al-Tha'alibi Zawiya (Arabic: زاوية سيدي عبد الرحمان الثعالبي) is a zawiya in the Casbah of Algiers in the commune of Casbah in Algeria. The name "Thaalibia" relates to Abd al-Rahman al-Tha'alibi.

== Presentation ==
Sidi Abderrahman established in the Casbah of Algiers this zawiya in 1460 CE, according to the Qadiriya tariqa, in order to recommend the murids and the saliks.

When he died during the year 1471 CE, corresponding to the year 875 AH, he was buried in a room inside his corner.

A mausoleum of his own was built immediately after his death to protect his grave from any damage resulting from the influx of visitors, the blessed and the supplicants.

== Compartments ==
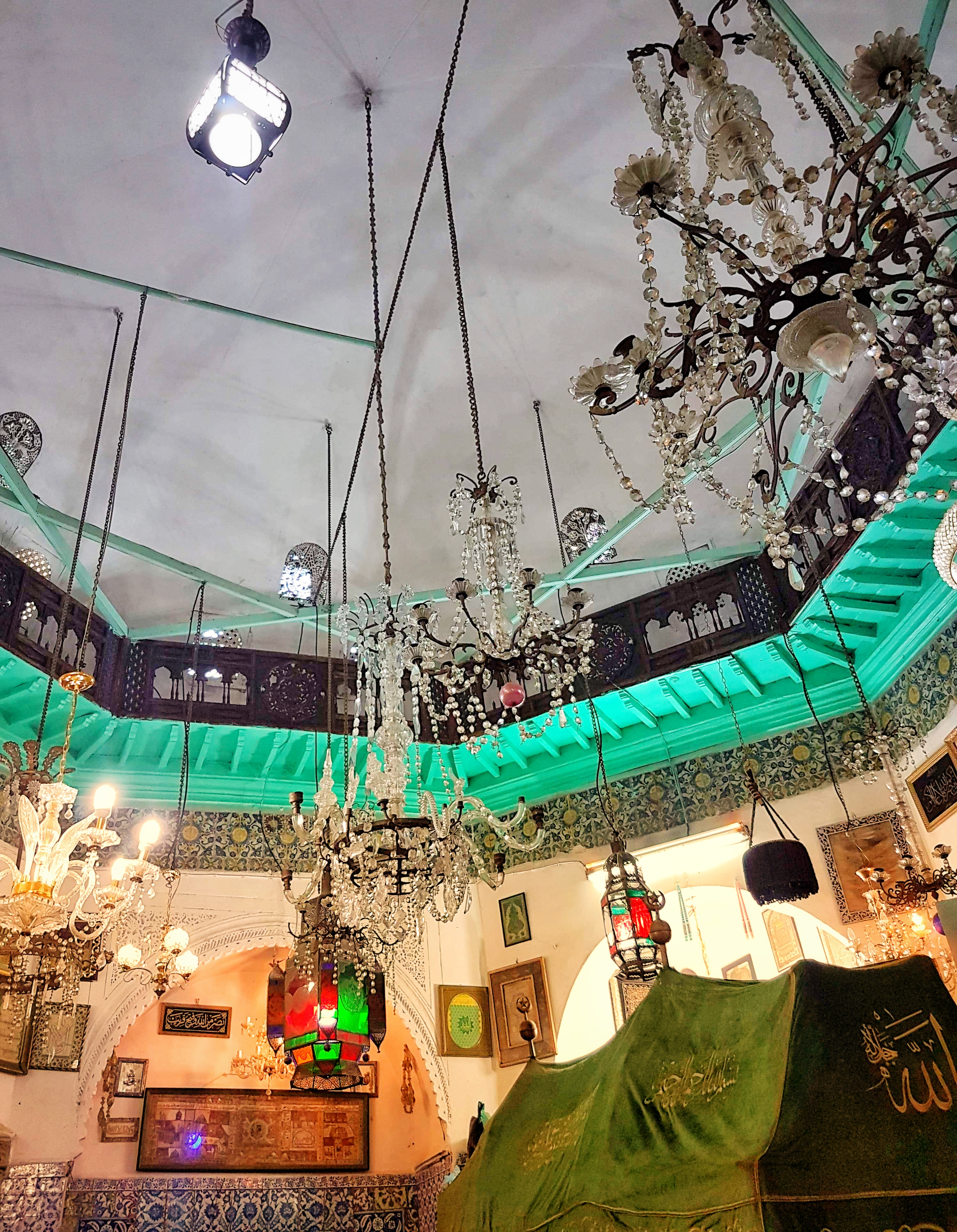
Mausoleum of Sidi Abderrahmane Et-Thaalibi

The structure of this institution is divided into compartments:

- Zawiya Thaalibia.
- Thaalibi Mosque.
- Thaalibia Cemetery.
- Thaalibi Mausoleum.

== Burials ==
- Sidi Abderrahmane Thaalibi
- Yusuf II Pasha, pasha
- Sidi Hassan, dey of Algiers
- Mustapha II, dey of Algiers
- Ibrahim, Mustapha's son
- Omar Agha, dey of Algiers
- Ahmed Bey, bey of Constantine and dey of Algiers

== Gallery ==
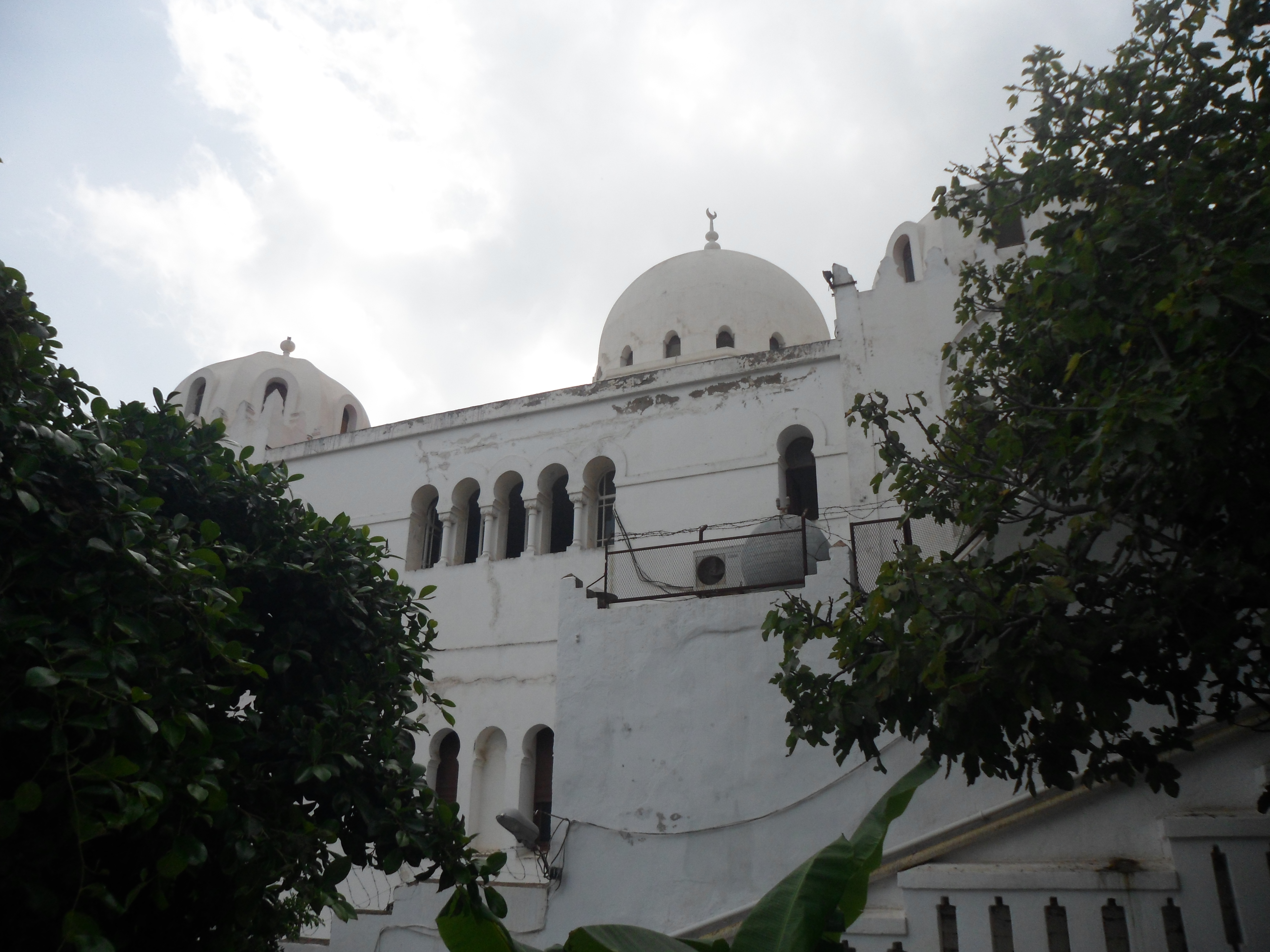
Zawiya Thaalibia

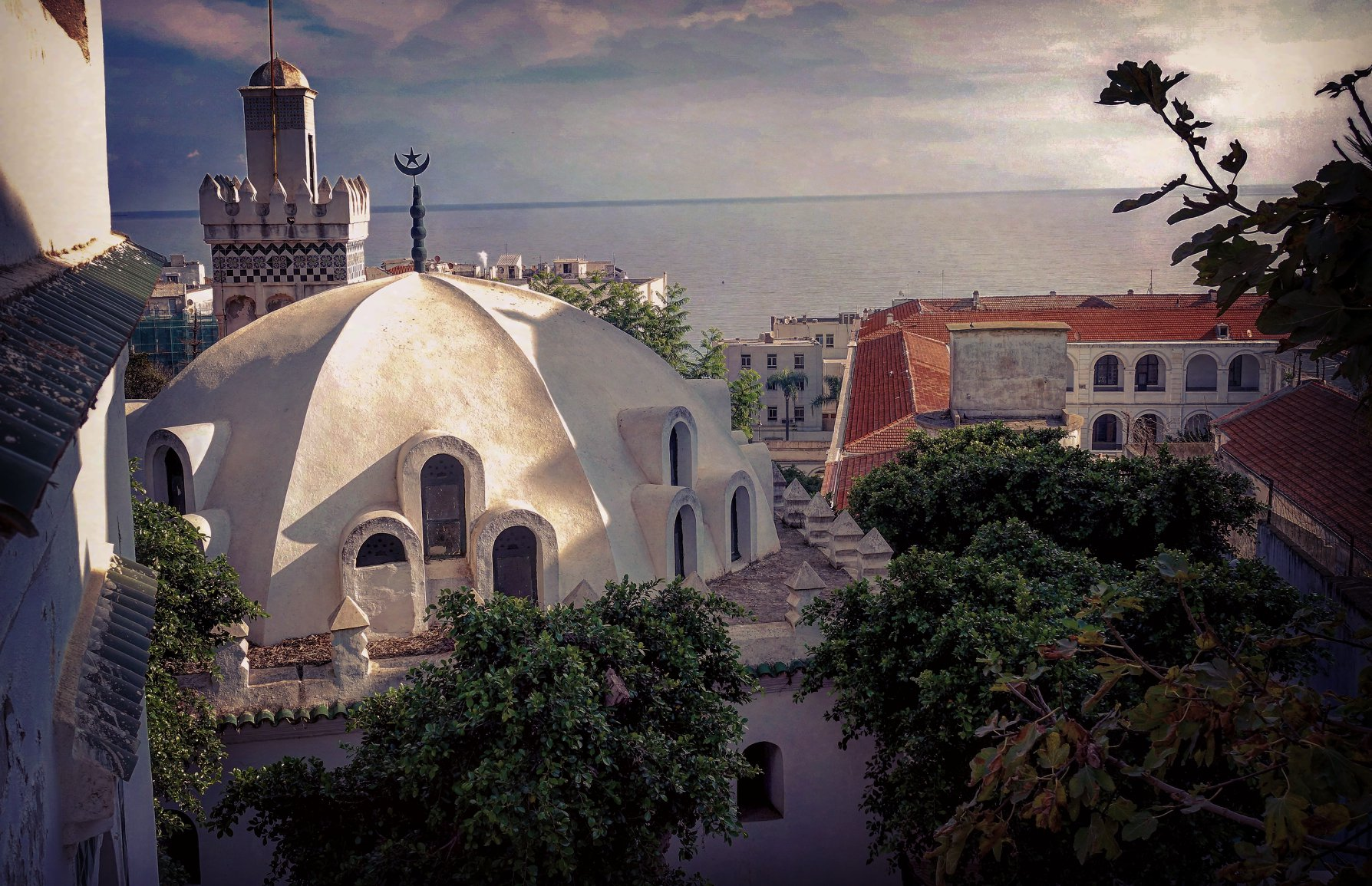
Zawiya Thaalibia

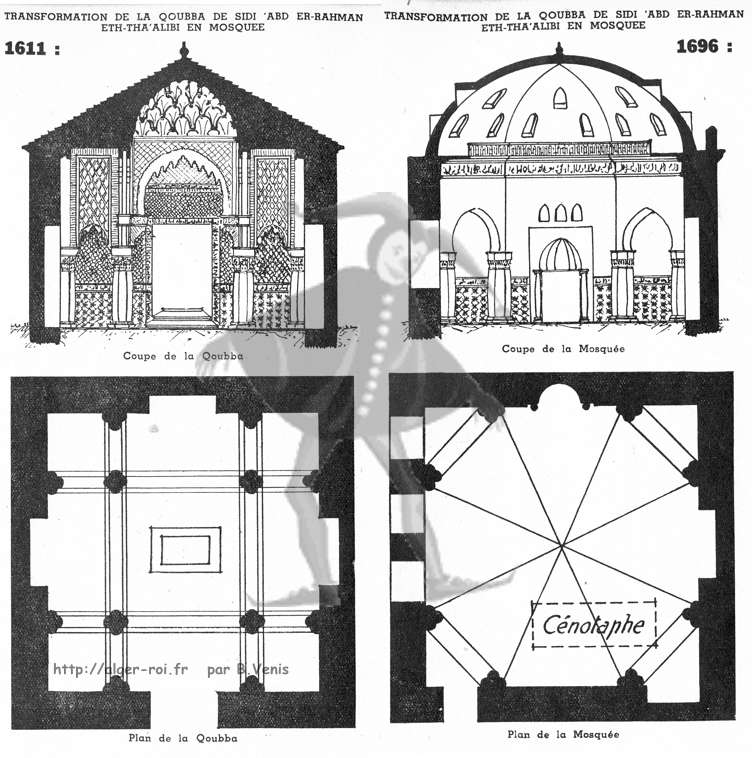
Mosque of Sidi Abderrahmane Et-Thaalibi

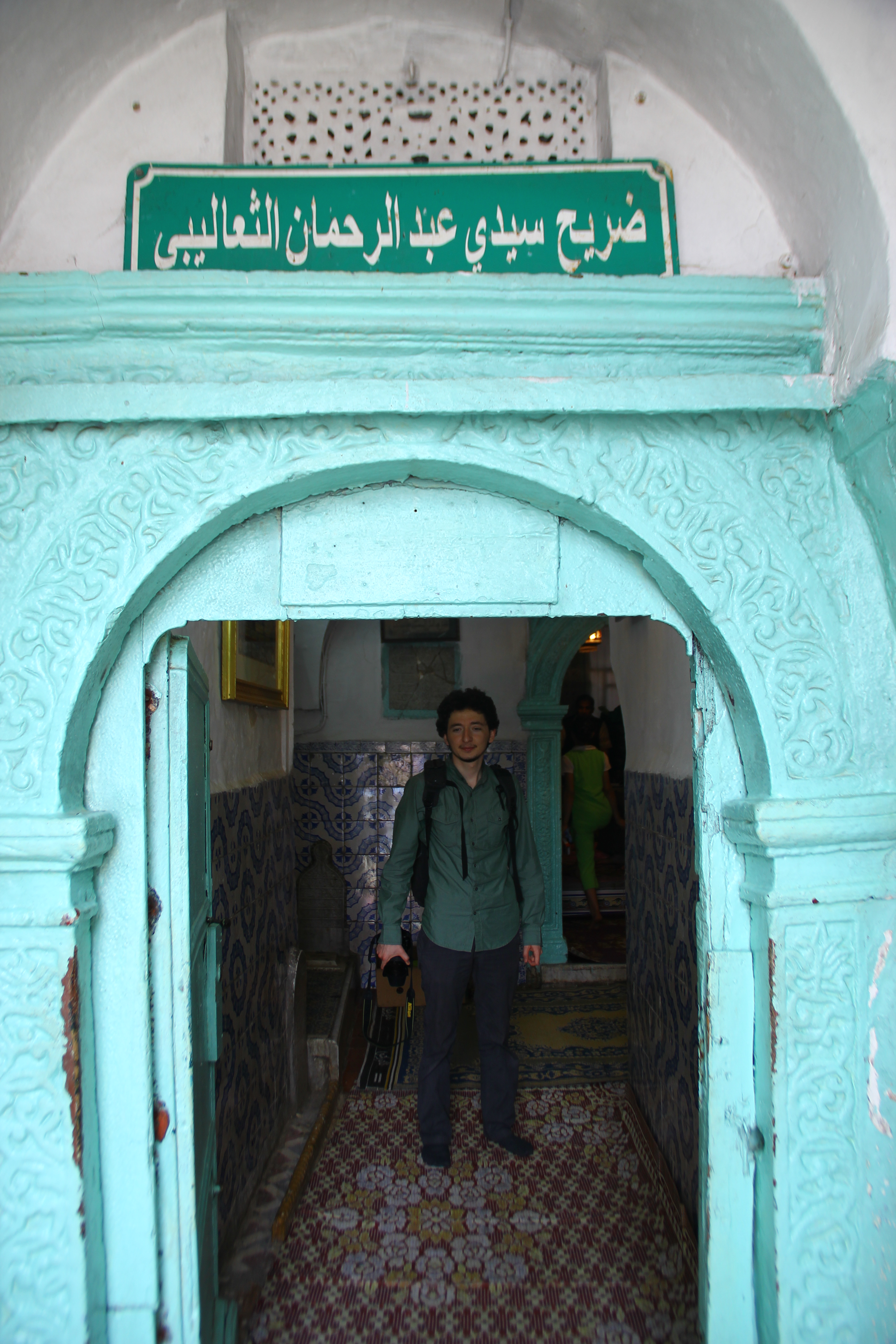
Mausoleum of Sidi Abderrahmane Et-Thaalibi

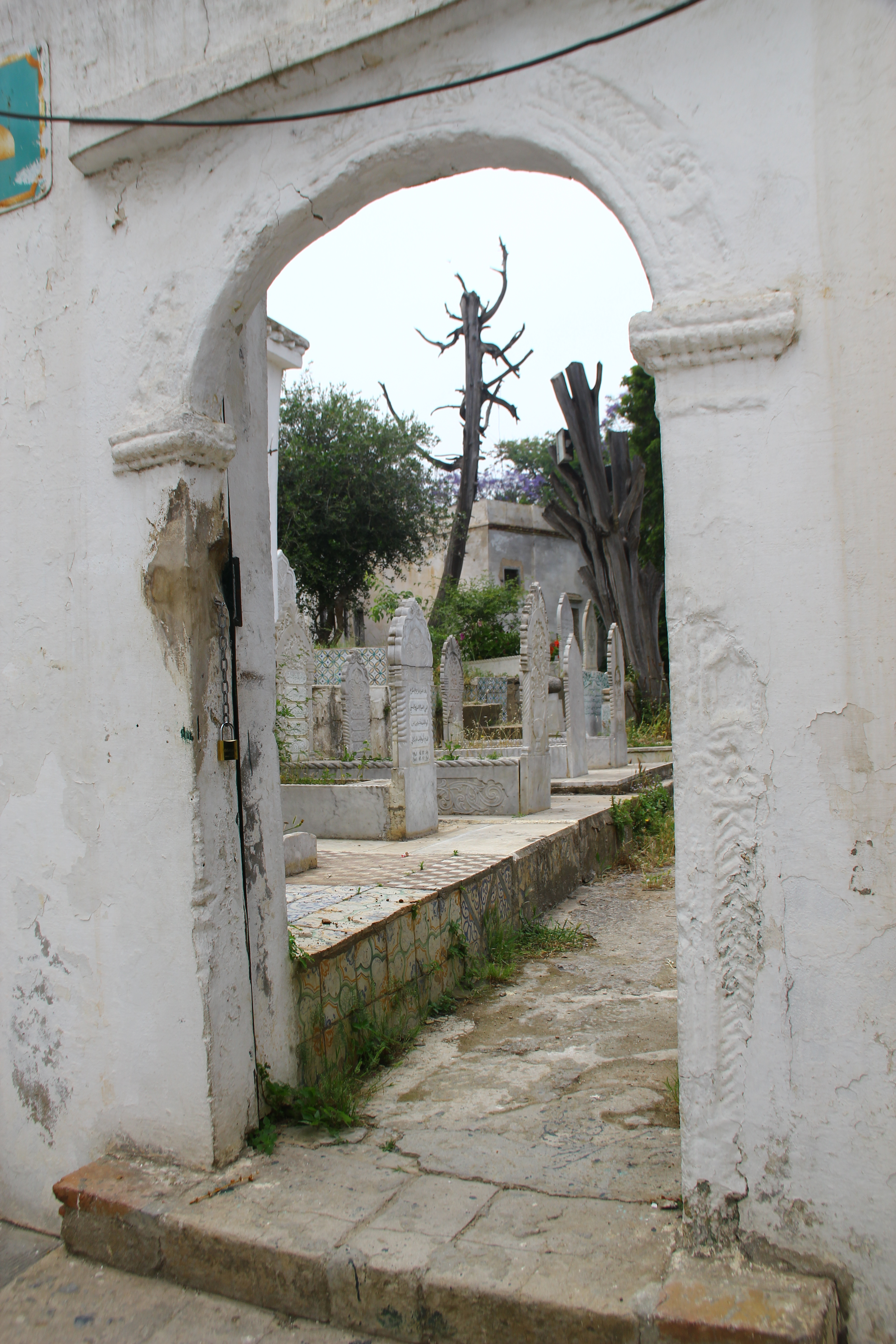
Thaalibia Cemetery

== See also ==
- Ministry of Religious Affairs and Endowments
- Algerian Islamic reference
- Zawiyas in Algeria
