= Thaalibia Publishing =

Publishing house in Algiers

- Predecessor: Rodosi press
- Founded: 1895 - 1896
- Founder: Kaddour Roudoci, Ali Roudoci
- Country of origin: Algeria
- Headquarters location: Number 1, Mustapha Ismail Street, Casbah, Algiers
- Distribution: Algeria, North Africa
- Publication types: Thaalibia Quran
- Nonfiction topics: Quran, Sunni books

Thaalibia Publishing (Arabic: المطبعة الثعالبية) is an Algerian publishing house based in Algiers and founded in 1895. It publishes books in religion, Sufism, literature, nationalist thought, and art as well as culture. Thaalibia Publishing has a wide distribution network within Algeria and North Africa.

== History ==
Thaalibia Publishing is considered the first Algerian publishing house to have been founded under the rule of French Algeria. It was established by Kaddour Roudoci (1876 - 1946) together with brother, Ali Roudoci. The enterprise employed tens of artists and workers.

== Publications ==
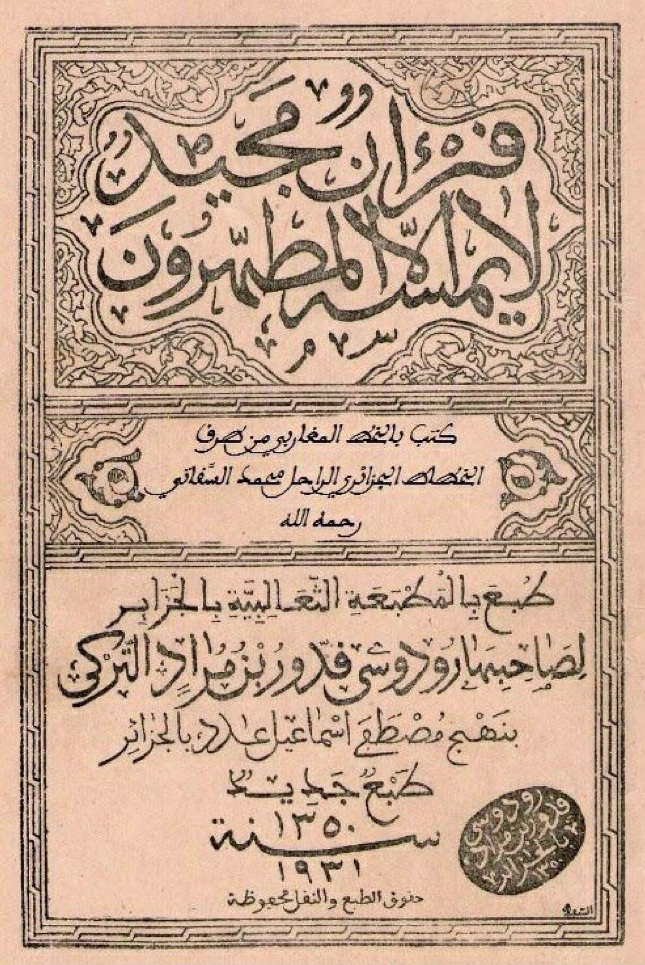
rightThaalibia Quran (1931 Edition).

Thaalibia press published well-known books as:

- Thaalibia Quran since 1905 til 1971.
- Mukhtasar Khalil in 1903.
- Thaalibia Catalog in 1928.
- Matn al-Assimia in 1928.
