= Thénia District =

Coordinates: 36°43′31″N 3°33′23″E

Thénia District دائرة الثنية
- District
- Location of Thénia within Boumerdès Province
- Country: Algeria
- Province: Boumerdès
- District seat: Thénia

Population (1998)
  - Total: 52,448
- Time zone: UTC+01 (CET)
- Municipalities: 4

Thénia is a district in Boumerdès Province, Algeria. It was named after its capital, Thénia which, under French rule, was called Ménerville.

== Municipalities ==
The district is further divided into 4 municipalities:

- Thénia
- Souk El-Had
- Beni Amrane
- Ammal

== Villages ==
The villages of Thénia District are:

- A
  - Aït Abdelhadi
  - Aït Afra
  - Aït Ali
  - Aït Dahmane
  - Aït Hamadouche
  - Aït Salah
  - Aït Si Amar
  - Aït Si Saïd
  - Azela
- B
  - Baloul
  - Ben Daoud
  - Beni Arab
  - Beni Khelifa
  - Bouaïdel
  - Bouchelaghem
  - Bou Ismaïl
  - Boukaraï
  - Boukhanfar
  - Bouredjouane
- C
  - Chorfa
- D
  - Debagha
  - Djenah
  - Doukane
  - Draâ Ben Hadhoum
- F
  - Fekhara
- G
  - Ghazibaouene
  - Gueddara
  - Gueraïchene
- H
  - Hadadcha
  - Haddada
  - Hini
- L
  - Louz
- M
  - Mahrane
  - Meraldene
  - Merchicha
  - Mezala
- O
  - Oued Djenane
  - Ouled Ali
  - Ouled Bellemou
  - Ouled Bessa
  - Ouled Djerrah
  - Ouled Mahmoud
  - Ouled Salah
- S
  - Sidi Fredj
  - Skhirat
  - Souiga
  - Soumâa
- T
  - Tabrahimt
  - Tachehat
  - Talamali
  - Talilt
  - Talmat
  - Tamsaout
  - Tebabkha
  - Thellath
  - Tigrine
  - Tijijga
  - Timizar
  - Titouna
  - Tiza
  - Tizouighine
  - Toulmout
  - Touzaline
- Z
  - Zenina

== Zawiya ==
- Zawiyet Sidi Boushaki

== History ==
=== French conquest ===
- Battle of Thénia (1837), a battle during the French conquest of Algeria.
- First Battle of the Issers (1837), a battle during the French conquest of Algeria.
- Battle of Thénia (1846), a battle during the French conquest of Algeria.
- Battle of Thénia (1871), a battle during the Mokrani Revolt of Algeria.

=== Algerian Revolution ===
- Ferme Gauthier

=== Salafist terrorism ===
- 2007 Souk El Had bombing (13 February 2007)
- 2008 Thénia bombing (29 January 2008)
- 2008 Beni Amrane bombings (9 June 2008)
- 2010 Ammal bombing (11 June 2010)
- 2012 Thénia bombing (11 January 2012)

== Rivers ==
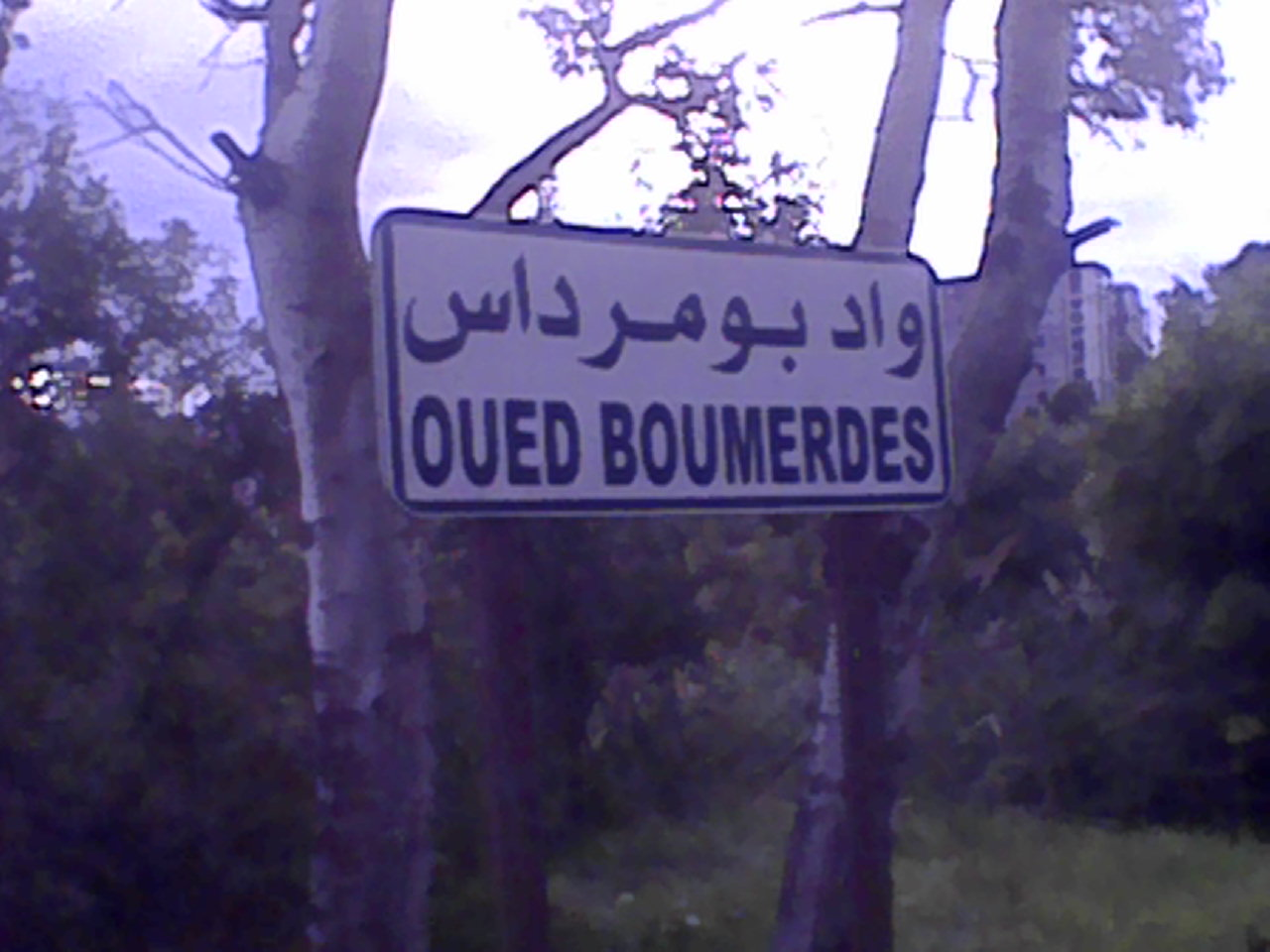
Boumerdès River

This district is crossed by several rivers:

- Arbia River
- Beni Arab River
- Boumerdès River
- Corso River
- Hamiz River
- Isser River
- Karma River
- Keddache River
- Meraldene River
- Réghaïa River
- Sidi Ali River

== Dams ==
This district has two dams:

- Meraldene Dam
- Beni Amrane Dam

== Football clubs ==
Club	Division	Level	Location	Logo
CMB Thénia	Ligue Régional II	5	Thénia	
O Souk El Had	Ligue de Football de la Wilaya	3	Souk El Had	
CS Ammal	Ligue de Football de la Wilaya	5	Ammal	
IRB Souk El Had	Ligue de Football de la Wilaya	3	Souk El Had	
US Beni Amrane	Ligue de Football de la Wilaya	3	Beni Amrane	

== Notable people ==
- Abdenour Boushaki, Algerian politician.
- Abderrahmane Boushaki, Algerian leader.
- Ahmed Bourenane, Algerian politician.
- Ahmed Hadhoum, Algerian politician.
- Ali Boushaki, Algerian theologian.
- Amine ibn El Boushaki, Algerian judoka.
- Boualem Boukacem, Algerian artist.
- Brahim Boushaki, Algerian theologian.
- Dahmane Deriche, Algerian politician.
- Dahmane Deriche, Algerian artist.
- Farid Ishak Boushaki, Algerian academician.
- Feriel Boushaki, Algerian artist.
- Firmus, Berber leader.
- Fodil Mezali, an Algerian journalist.
- Gildo, Berber leader.
- Hocine Soltani, Algerian boxer.
- Lyès Deriche, Algerian leader.
- Maamar Bettayeb, Algerian academician.
- Mascezel, Berber leader.
- Mohamed Aïchaoui, Algerian journalist.
- Mohamed Allalou, Algerian boxer.
- Mohamed Arkab, Algerian politician.
- Mohamed Boumerdassi, Algerian artist.
- Mohamed Bourenane, Algerian politician.
- Mohamed Deriche, Algerian politician.
- Mohamed Deriche, Algerian academician.
- Mohamed Hassaïne, Algerian journalist.
- Mohamed Mechkarini, Algerian militant.
- Mohamed Missouri, Algerian boxer.
- Mohamed Nassim Boushaki, Algerian academician.
- Mohamed Rahmoune, Algerian politician.
- Mohamed Seghir Boushaki, Algerian politician.
- Mustapha Ishak Boushaki, Algerian academician.
- Nadia Boumerdassi, Algerian artist.
- Noureddine Melikechi, Algerian physicist.
- Nubel, Berber leader.
- Rachid Deriche, Algerian academician.
- Salah Bouchatal, Algerian politician.
- Salem Anou, Algerian politician.
- Shahnez Boushaki, Algerian basketball player.
- Tarek Boushaki, Algerian academician.
- Yahia Boushaki (Shahid), Algerian politician.
