= Debagha =

- Nickname: Idebaghene
- Motto: دباغة
- Interactive map of Debagha
- Commune: Beni Amrane
- District: Thénia District
- Province: Boumerdès Province
- Region: Kabylie
- Country: Algeria Algeria

Area
  - Total: 3 km^{2} (1.2 sq mi)

Dimensions
  - Length: 2 km (1.2 mi)
  - Width: 1.5 km (0.93 mi)
- Elevation: 480 m (1,570 ft)
- Time zone: UTC+01:00
- Area code: 35006

Debagha or Idebaghene is a village in the Boumerdès Province in Kabylie, Algeria.

== Location ==
The village is surrounded by the Meraldene River, Isser River, and Boumerdès River, and the towns of Beni Amrane and Thénia in the Khachna mountain range.
