= Legata =

Coordinates: 36°44′56″N 3°40′59″E

Legata لقاطة
- Commune and town
- Interactive map of Legata
- Country: Algeria
- Province: Boumerdès Province

Population (1998)
  - Total: 11,884
- Time zone: UTC+1 (CET)

Legata (Arabic لقاطة) is a town and commune in the Bordj Menaïel District of Boumerdès Province, Algeria, between Bordj Menaïel and Issers. According to the 1998 census it had a population of 11,884.

== History ==
In the mid-19th century, the area was known as Haouch Legata. It was home to the Ben-Kanoun family, which owned some 4000 hectares in the area. In the wake of the Mokrani Revolt, the French government expropriated this land to create the colony of Isserbourg there in 1874. After Algeria's independence in 1962, the name of Legata was restored.

== Nature ==
In the north of the commune along the Mediterranean coast, the Mandoura Forest is dominated by Aleppo pine and other Mediterranean maquis flora. The Isser River runs from near the town itself to the edge of the forest.
