= Timizar, Boumerdès =

Timizar
- Motto: تيميزار
- Interactive map of Timizar
- Commune: Ammal
- District: Thénia District
- Province: Boumerdès Province
- Region: Kabylie
- Country: Algeria Algeria

Area
  - Total: 7.2 km^{2} (2.8 sq mi)

Dimensions
  - Length: 2.4 km (1.5 mi)
  - Width: 3 km (1.9 mi)
- Elevation: 510 m (1,670 ft)
- Time zone: UTC+01:00
- Area code: 35006

Timizar is a village in the Boumerdès Province in Kabylie, Algeria.

== Location ==
The village is surrounded by Isser River and the town of Ammal in the Khachna mountain range.
