= Aït Abdelhadi =

- Motto: آيت عبد الهادي
- Interactive map of Aït Abdelhadi
- Commune: Ammal
- District: Thénia District
- Province: Boumerdès Province
- Region: Kabylie
- Country: Algeria Algeria

Area
  - Total: 5.6 km^{2} (2.2 sq mi)

Dimensions
  - Length: 2.8 km (1.7 mi)
  - Width: 2 km (1.2 mi)
- Elevation: 530 m (1,740 ft)
- Time zone: UTC+01:00
- Area code: 35006

Aït Abdelhadi is a village in the Boumerdès Province in Kabylie, Algeria.

== Location ==
The village is surrounded by Isser River and the town of Ammal in the Khachna mountain range.
