= Doukane =

- Motto: دوكان
- Interactive map of Doukane
- Commune: Ammal
- District: Thénia District
- Province: Boumerdès Province
- Region: Kabylie
- Country: Algeria Algeria

Area
  - Total: 3.5 km^{2} (1.4 sq mi)

Dimensions
  - Length: 1.75 km (1.09 mi)
  - Width: 2 km (1.2 mi)
- Elevation: 560 m (1,840 ft)
- Time zone: UTC+01:00
- Area code: 35006

Doukane is a village in the Boumerdès Province in Kabylie, Algeria.

== Location ==
The village is surrounded by Isser River and the town of Ammal in the Khachna mountain range.
