= Aït Si Saïd =

- Motto: آيت سي سعيد
- Interactive map of Aït Si Saïd
- Commune: Beni Amrane
- District: Thénia District
- Province: Boumerdès Province
- Region: Kabylie
- Country: Algeria Algeria

Area
  - Total: 5 km^{2} (1.9 sq mi)

Dimensions
  - Length: 2.5 km (1.6 mi)
  - Width: 2 km (1.2 mi)
- Elevation: 400 m (1,300 ft)
- Time zone: UTC+01:00
- Area code: 35006

Aït Si Saïd is a village in the Boumerdès Province in Kabylie, Algeria.

== Location ==
The village is surrounded by Isser River and the town of Beni Amrane in the Khachna mountain range.
