= Ouled Bellemou =

- Motto: أولاد بلمو
- Interactive map of Ouled Bellemou
- Commune: Ammal
- District: Thénia District
- Province: Boumerdès Province
- Region: Kabylie
- Country: Algeria Algeria

Area
  - Total: 6.9 km^{2} (2.7 sq mi)

Dimensions
  - Length: 3 km (1.9 mi)
  - Width: 2.3 km (1.4 mi)
- Elevation: 490 m (1,610 ft)
- Time zone: UTC+01:00
- Area code: 35006

Ouled Bellemou is a village in the Boumerdès Province in Kabylie, Algeria.

== Location ==
The village is surrounded by Isser River and the town of Ammal in the Khachna mountain range.
