= Haddada, Boumerdès =

Haddada
- Village
- Nickname: Ihaddadene
- Motto: حدادة
- Interactive map of Haddada
- Commune: Beni Amrane
- District: Thénia District
- Province: Boumerdès Province
- Region: Kabylie
- Country: Algeria

Area
  - Total: 4 km^{2} (1.5 sq mi)

Dimensions
  - Length: 2 km (1.2 mi)
  - Width: 2 km (1.2 mi)
- Elevation: 490 m (1,610 ft)
- Time zone: UTC+01:00
- Area code: 35006

Haddada, also known as Ihaddadene, is a village in the Boumerdès Province in Kabylie, Algeria.

== Location ==
The village is situated near the Meraldene River, Isser River, and Boumerdès River. It is surrounded by the towns of Beni Amrane and Thénia in the Khachna mountain range.
