= Boukaraï =

- Motto: بوقراي
- Interactive map of Boukaraï
- Commune: Beni Amrane
- District: Thénia District
- Province: Boumerdès Province
- Region: Kabylie
- Country: Algeria Algeria

Area
  - Total: 4 km^{2} (1.5 sq mi)

Dimensions
  - Length: 2 km (1.2 mi)
  - Width: 2 km (1.2 mi)
- Elevation: 480 m (1,570 ft)
- Time zone: UTC+01:00
- Area code: 35006

Boukaraï is a village in the Boumerdès Province in Kabylie, Algeria.

== Location ==
The village is surrounded by Isser River and the town of Beni Amrane in the Khachna mountain range.
