= Tiza, Boumerdès =

Tiza
- Motto: تيزة
- Interactive map of Tiza
- Commune: Ammal
- District: Thénia District
- Province: Boumerdès Province
- Region: Kabylie
- Country: Algeria Algeria

Area
  - Total: 6 km^{2} (2.3 sq mi)

Dimensions
  - Length: 2 km (1.2 mi)
  - Width: 3 km (1.9 mi)
- Elevation: 470 m (1,540 ft)
- Time zone: UTC+01:00
- Area code: 35006

Tiza is a village in the Boumerdès Province in Kabylie, Algeria.

== Location ==
The village is surrounded by Isser River and the town of Ammal in the Khachna mountain range.
