= Chorfa, Boumerdès =

Chorfa
- Motto: الشرفة
- Interactive map of Chorfa
- Commune: Beni Amrane
- District: Thénia District
- Province: Boumerdès Province
- Region: Kabylie
- Country: Algeria Algeria

Area
  - Total: 4.6 km^{2} (1.8 sq mi)

Dimensions
  - Length: 2 km (1.2 mi)
  - Width: 2.3 km (1.4 mi)
- Elevation: 510 m (1,670 ft)
- Time zone: UTC+01:00
- Area code: 35006

Chorfa is a village in the Boumerdès Province in Kabylie, Algeria.

== Location ==
The village is surrounded by Meraldene River, Isser River and Boumerdès River and the towns of Beni Amrane and Thénia in the Khachna mountain range.
