= Djaouna =

- Motto: جعونة
- Interactive map of Djaouna
- Coordinates: 36.7099707°N 3.6336384°E
- Commune: Issers
- District: Isser District
- Province: Boumerdès Province
- Region: Kabylie
- Country: Algeria Algeria

Area
  - Total: 5 km^{2} (1.9 sq mi)

Dimensions
  - Length: 2 km (1.2 mi)
  - Width: 2.5 km (1.6 mi)
- Elevation: 180 m (590 ft)
- Time zone: UTC+01:00
- Area code: 35016

Djaouna is a village in the Boumerdès Province in Kabylie, Algeria.

== Location ==
The village is surrounded by Isser River and the towns of Issers and Thénia.
