= Boumerdès Province =

Province of Algeria

Boumerdès Province ولاية بومرداس
- Province
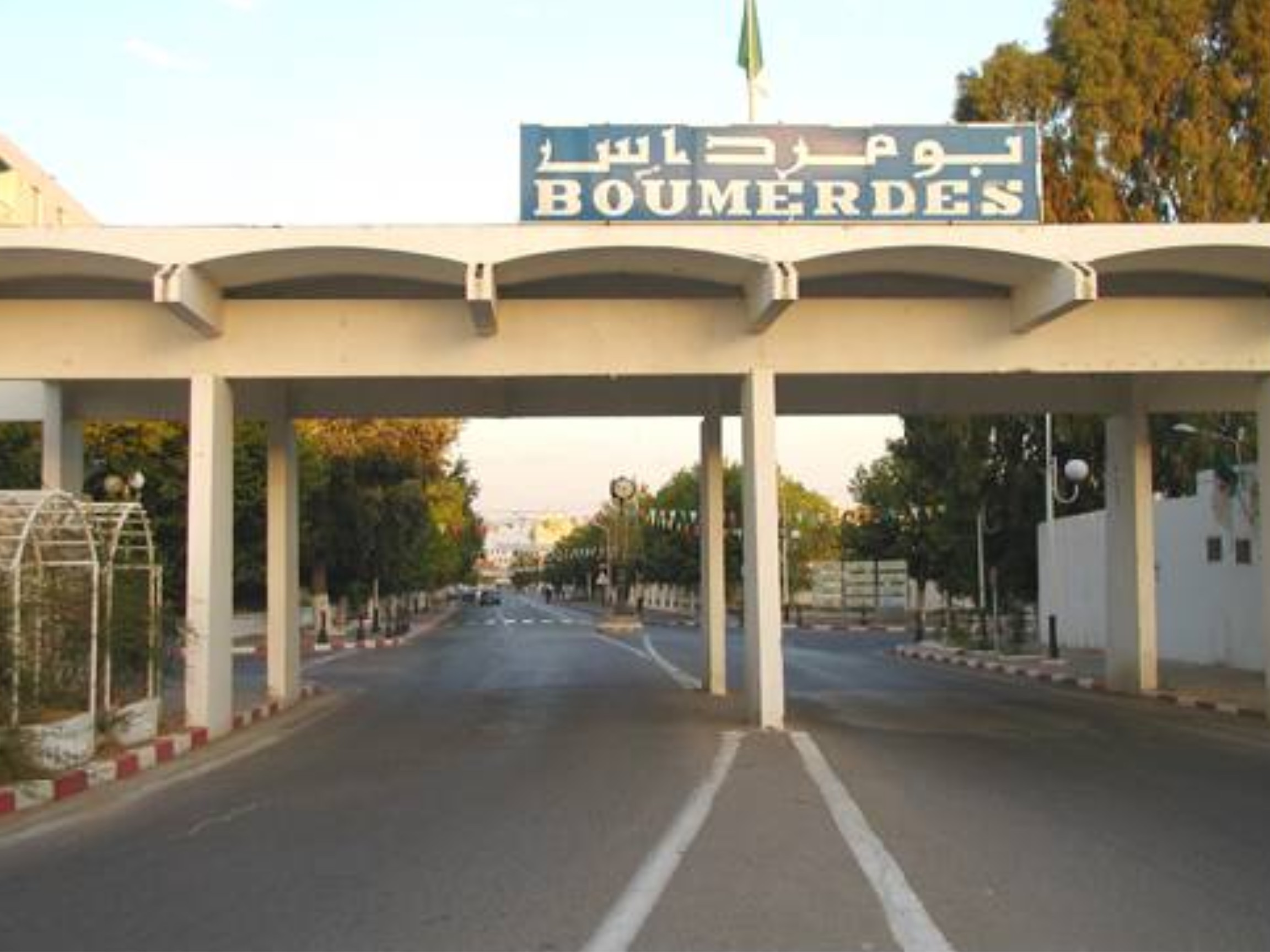

- Map of Algeria highlighting Boumerdès
- Coordinates: 36°46′N 03°29′E
- Country: Algeria
- Capital: Boumerdès

Government
  - Wāli: Yahia Yahiatene

Area
  - Total: 1,591 km^{2} (614 sq mi)

Population (2008)
  - Total: 795,019
  - Density: 499.7/km^{2} (1,294/sq mi)
- Time zone: UTC+01 (CET)
- Area Code: +213 (0) 24
- ISO 3166 code: DZ-35
- Districts: 9
- Municipalities: 32

Boumerdès (Arabic: ولاية بومرداس) is a province (wilaya) of northern Algeria. It is located in the Kabylia region, between Algiers and Tizi-Ouzou, with its capital at the coastal city of Boumerdès (formerly Rocher-Noir) just east of Algiers.

== Administrative divisions ==
It is made up of 9 districts and 32 communes.

=== Districts ===
1. Baghlia
2. Bordj Ménaïl
3. Boudouaou
4. Boumerdès
5. Dellys
6. Isser
7. Khemis El Khechna
8. Naciria
9. Thénia

=== Communes ===
1. Aafir
2. Ammal
3. Baghlia
4. Ben Choud
5. Beni Amrane
6. Bordj Menaiel (Bordj Ménaïl)
7. Boudouaou
8. Boudouaou-El-Bahri
9. Boumerdès
10. Bouzegza Keddara
11. Chabet el Ameur
12. Corso
13. Dellys
14. Djinet
15. El Kharrouba
16. Hammedi
17. Issers
18. Keddara
19. Khemis El-Khechna
20. Larbatache
21. Legata
22. Naciria
23. Ouled Aissa
24. Ouled Hedadj
25. Ouled Moussa
26. Si-Mustapha
27. Sidi Daoud
28. Souk El-Had
29. Taourga
30. Thenia
31. Tidjelabine
32. Timezrit
33. Zemmouri

== Neighbourhoods ==
The neighbourhoods of Boumerdès Province are:

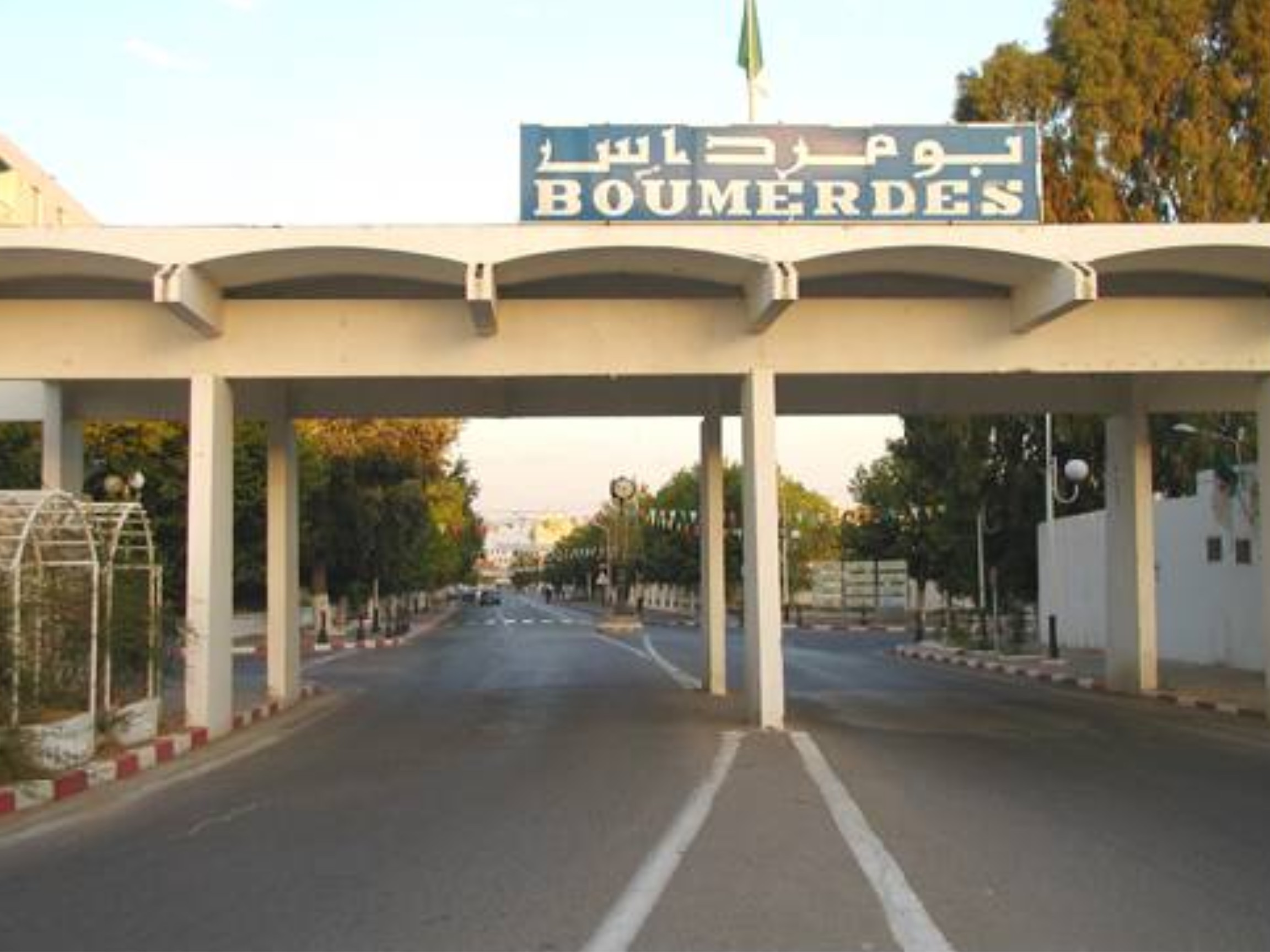
Cité Ali Bouyahiaoui

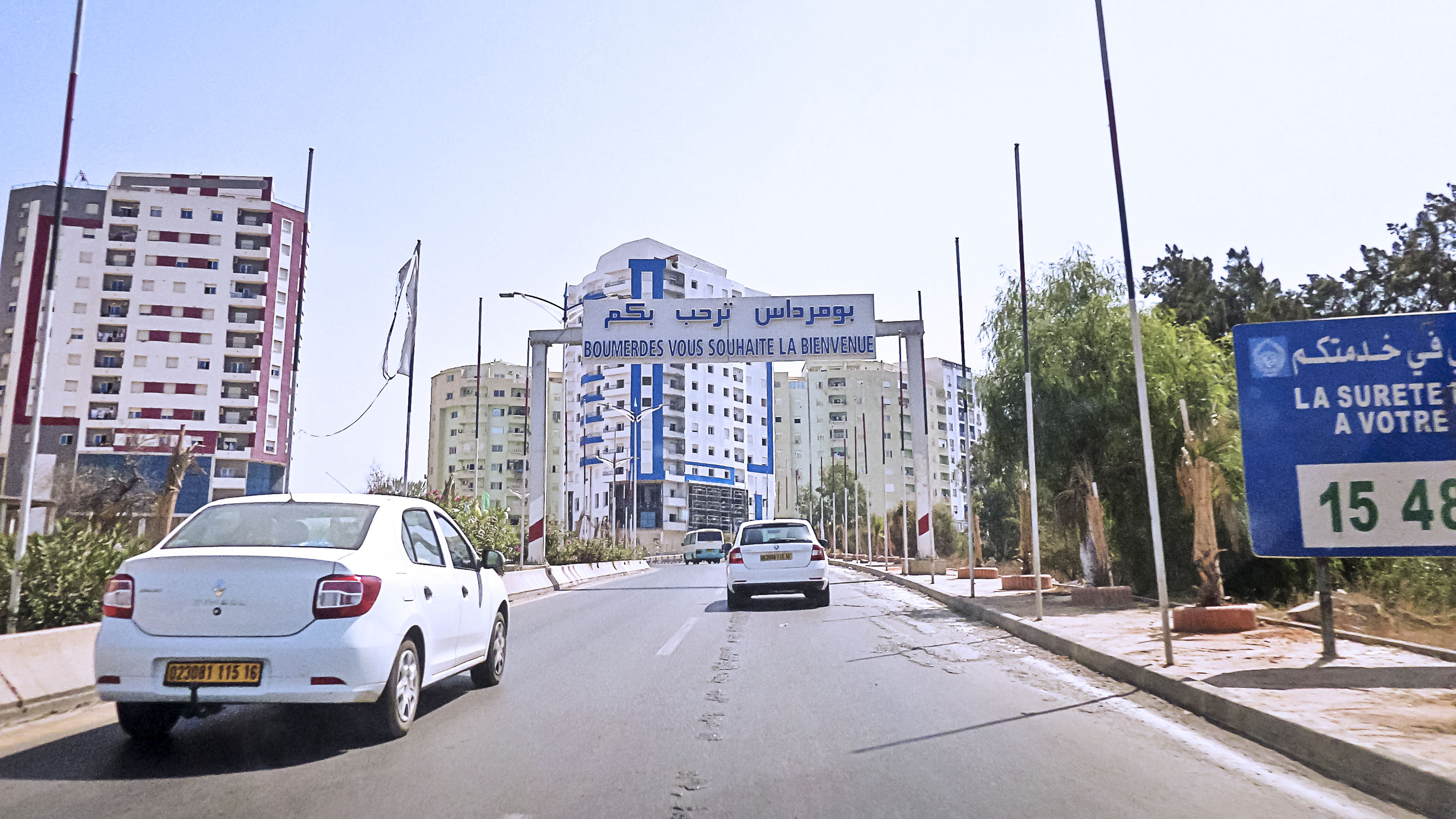
Cité 11 décembre 1960

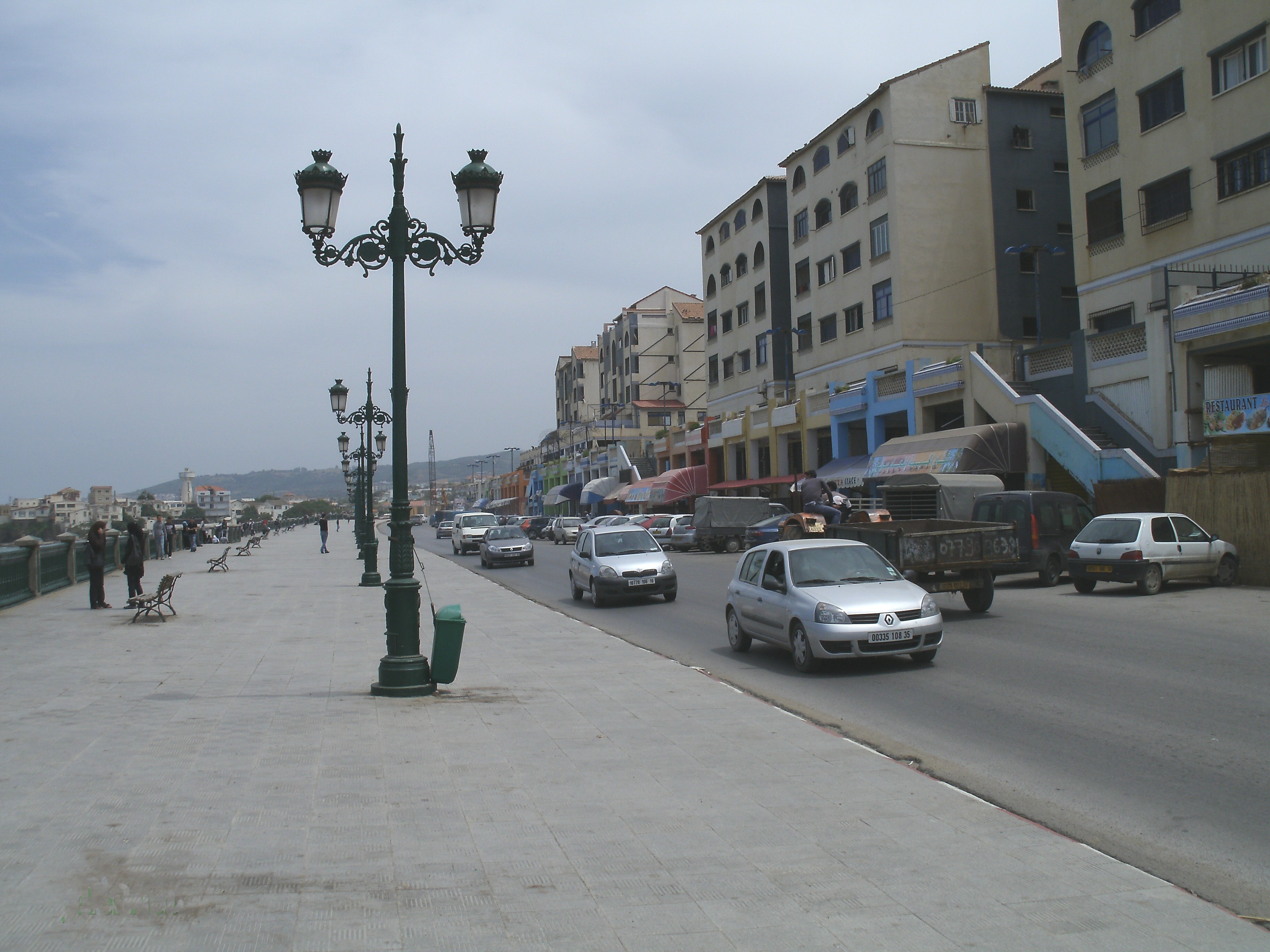
Quartier du front de mer

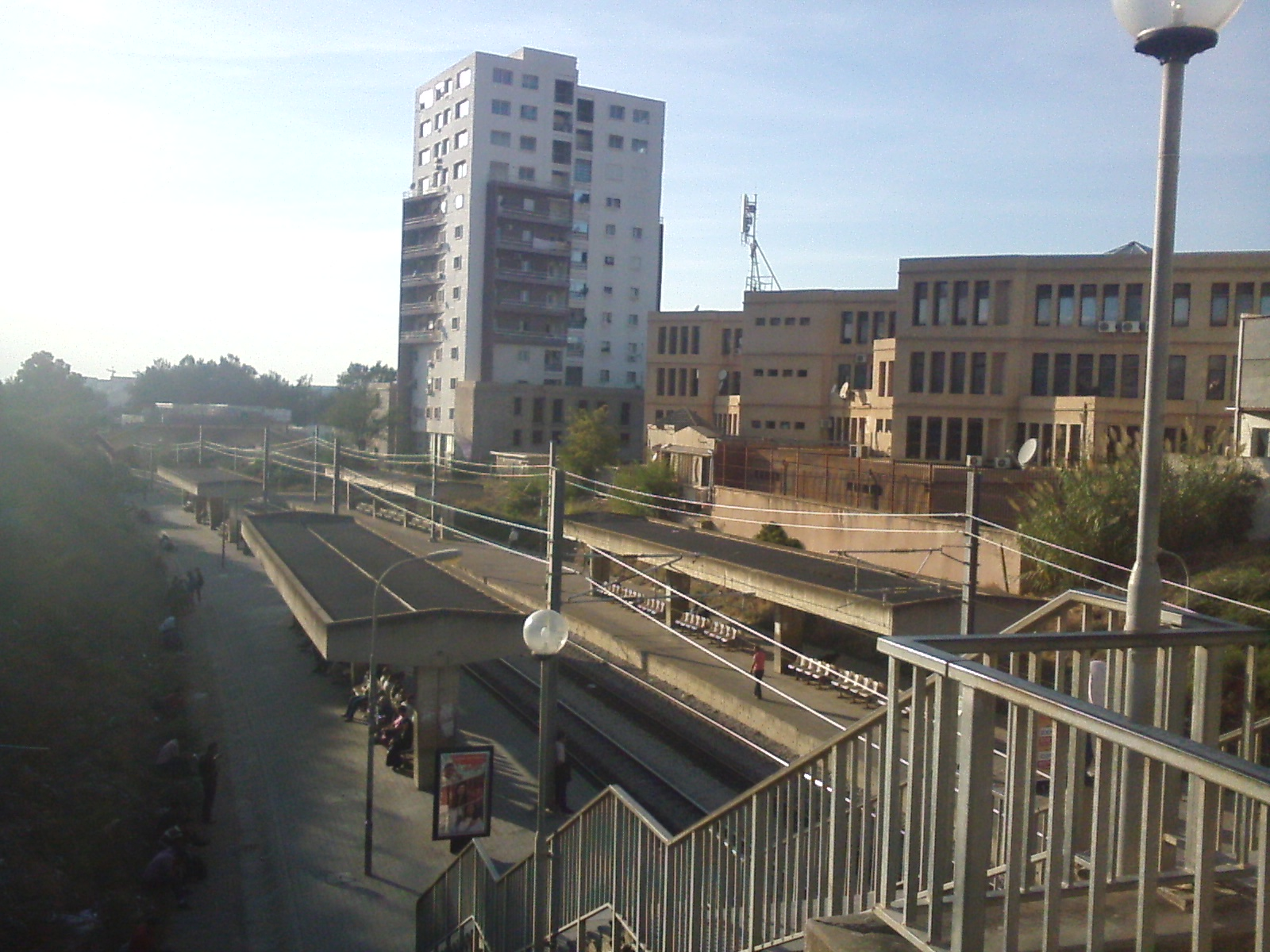
Cité Ibn Khaldoun

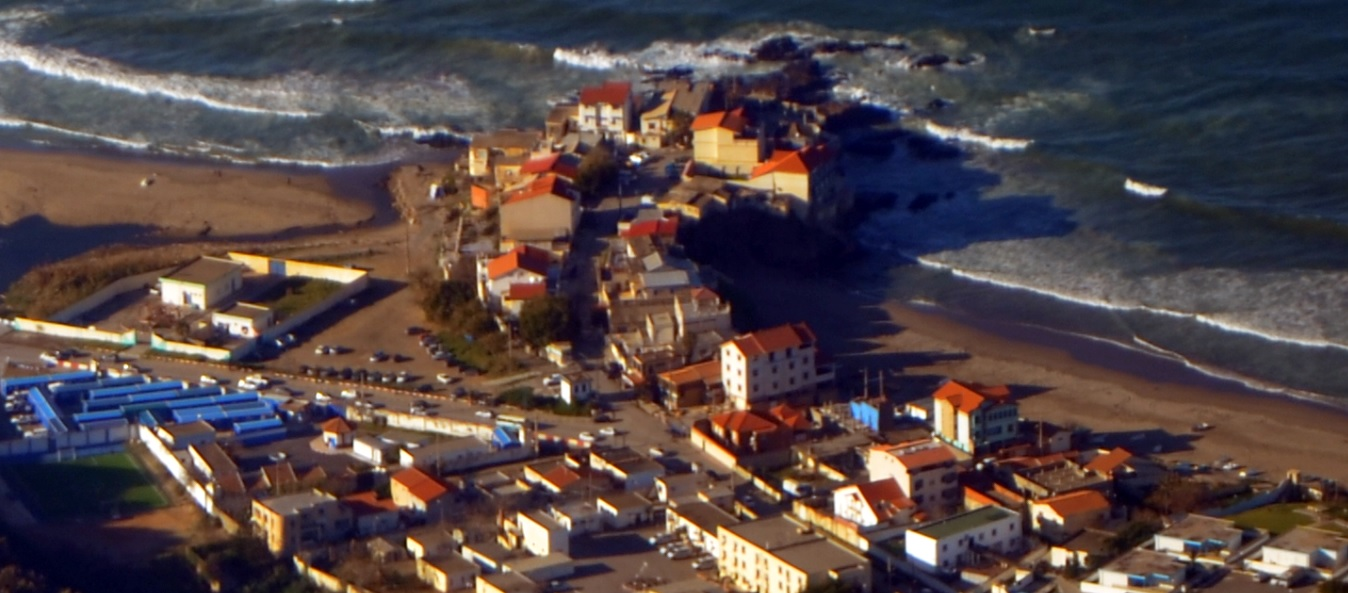
Cité du Rocher Noir

== Villages ==
The villages of Boumerdès Province are:

- A
  - Ahl El Koudia
  - Ahl El Oued
  - Aït Abdelhadi
  - Aït Afra
  - Aït Ali
  - Aït Dahmane
  - Aït Hamadouche
  - Aït Salah
  - Aït Si Amar
  - Aït Si Saïd
  - Azela
- B
  - Baloul
  - Belhasnet
  - Ben Daoud
  - Ben Younes
  - Beni Arab
  - Beni Fouda
  - Beni Khelifa
  - Berreghlou
  - Bou Ismaïl
  - Bouaïdel
  - Bouchelaghem
  - Boukaraï
  - Boukhanfar
  - Bouredjouane
- C
  - Chender
  - Chorfa
- D
  - Debagha
  - Djaouna
  - Djenah
  - Doukane
  - Draâ Ben Hadhoum
- E
  - El Bor
- F
  - Fekhara
- G
  - Ghazibaouene
  - Gueddara
  - Gueraïchene
- H
  - Hadadcha
  - Haddada
  - Hadj Ahmed
  - Hini
- L
  - Louz
- M
  - Mahrane
  - Mahsas
  - Medjber
  - Meraïel
  - Meraldene
  - Merchicha
  - Mezala
- O
  - Oued Djenane
  - Ouled Ali
  - Ouled Bellemou
  - Ouled Bendou
  - Ouled Bessa
  - Ouled Bouhmed
  - Ouled Boumerdès
  - Ouled Djerrah
  - Ouled Hocine
  - Ouled Mahmoud
  - Ouled Salah
- S
  - Sidi Fredj
  - Sidi Yahia
  - Skhirat
  - Souiga
  - Soumâa
- T
  - Tabrahimt
  - Tachehat
  - Talamali
  - Talilt
  - Talmat
  - Tamsaout
  - Tebabkha
  - Thellath
  - Tigrine
  - Tijijga
  - Timizar
  - Titouna
  - Tiza
  - Tizouighine
  - Toulmout
  - Touzaline
- Z
  - Zaatra
  - Zemmouri El Bahri
  - Zenina
- Others
  - Ghoumrasa
  - Amsetas
  - Ouennougha
  - Hachalfa
  - Bouarouss
  - Itoubal
  - Blad Guitoun
  - Ouled Boudhehar
  - Laazib Merabtine
  - Ouled Khelif
  - Laazib Merah
  - Ben Kanoun
  - Ali Boudhehar
  - Ahmed Bedjbedj
  - Lounes Mechaïri
  - Ouled Ziane

== Geology ==
Several mountain peaks are found in this province:

- Bouzegza Mountain (1032 m)
- Djerrah Mount (740 m)
- Ighil Zenabir Mount (630 m)
- Ben Norah Mount (467 m)
- Sidi Fredj Mount (452 m)
- Bouarous Mount (444 m)
- Soumâa Mount (430 m)
- Cap Blanc Mount (420 m)
- Mahelma Forest

== Geography ==
The province is largely mountainous, with a long coastline and a number of rivers, notably the Isser, Meraldene and Sebaou. Its western edges have in effect become suburbs of Algiers as the capital has expanded.

== History ==
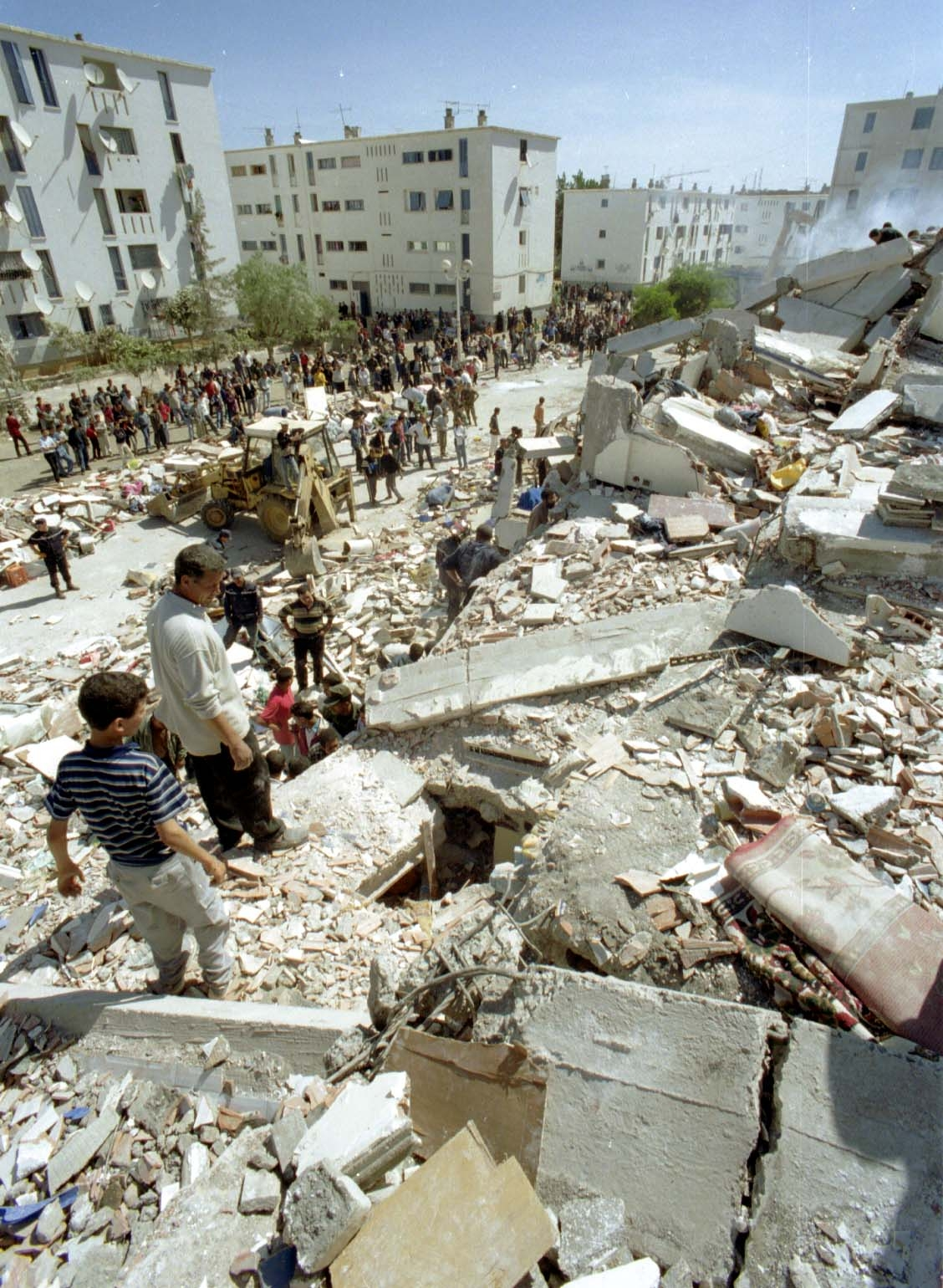
2003 Boumerdès earthquake

The three towns of Zemmouri El Bahri (Rusubbicari), Djinet (Cissi), and Dellys (Rusucurium), all of Phoenician foundation, were the province's principal ancient sites, although smaller Roman towns existed inland, as at Thenia, called Nubel's Citadel, and at Taourga; at none do any significant classical ruins remain. Zemmouri El Bahri (under the name of Marsa-d-Dajaj) and Dellys both attained some significance in the Islamic period, beginning with Hammadid times; the largely Ottoman-era casbah of Dellys remains an attraction. Boumerdès itself, called Rocher-Noir in the colonial period, was expanded substantially following the establishment of the new wilaya in 1984.

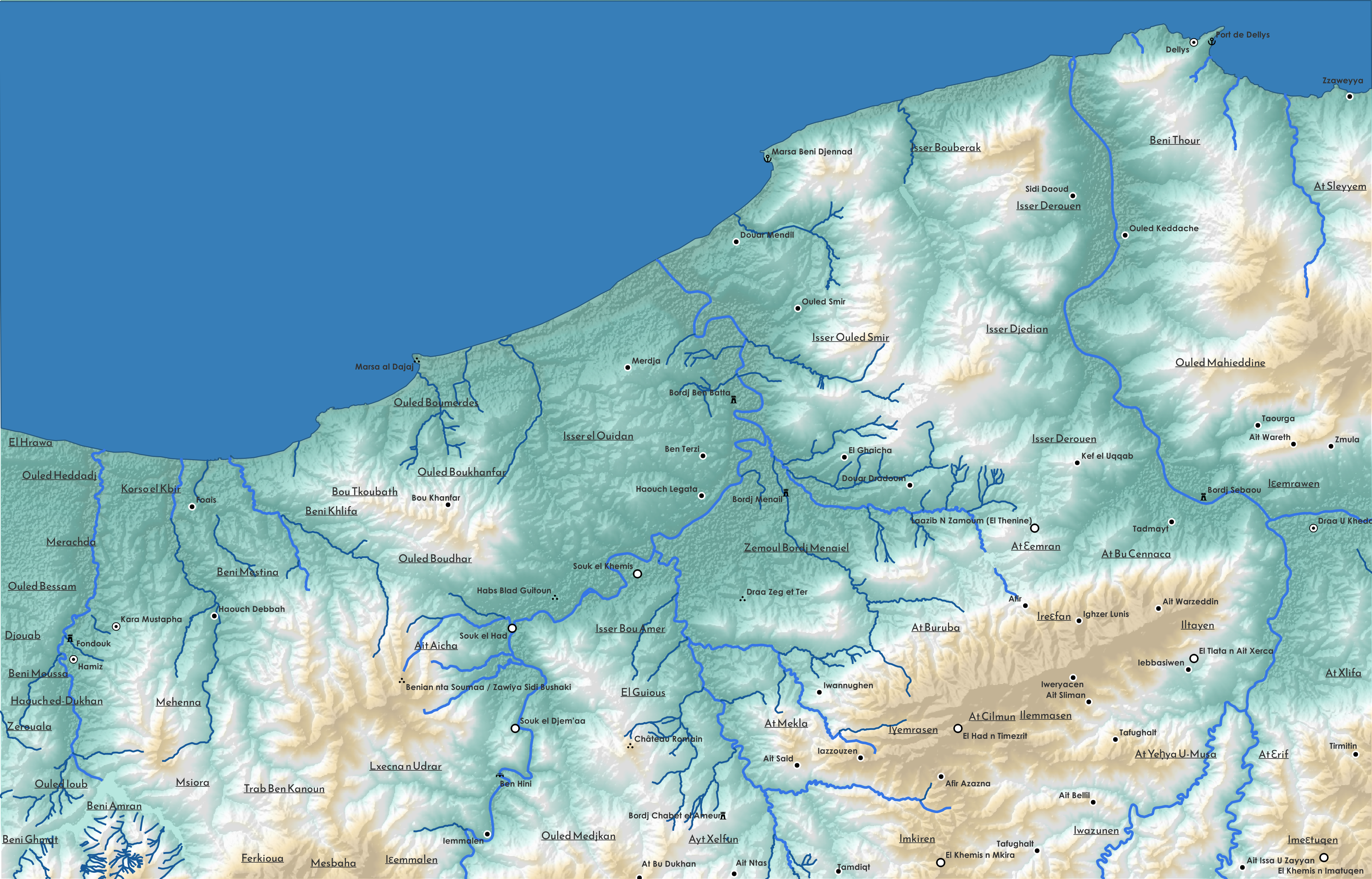
The Boumerdes province region in 1830, at the start of the French invasion

== 2003 earthquake ==
The province was very hard hit by the 2003 Boumerdès earthquake, whose epicentre was near Zemmouri.

Since the occurrence of the El Asnam earthquake on October 10, 1980, this province has not ceased to feel minor earthquakes.

The occurrence of weak tremors was further accentuated in the aftermath of the Chenoua earthquake of October 29, 1989.

From the earthquake of Wednesday May 21, 2003, telluric aftershocks lasted for years before stabilizing at low magnitudes.

Since 2003, the area encompassing this province has been classified as a high seismic risk region to make adequate technical provisions during the construction of houses and buildings.

The technical control of buildings in this province has become more rigorous and strict with regard to construction materials and construction.

The victims of this earthquake, who were housed in chalets and prefabricated houses, were still in 2020 in the process of being relocated to new apartments.

== Resistance against French invasion ==
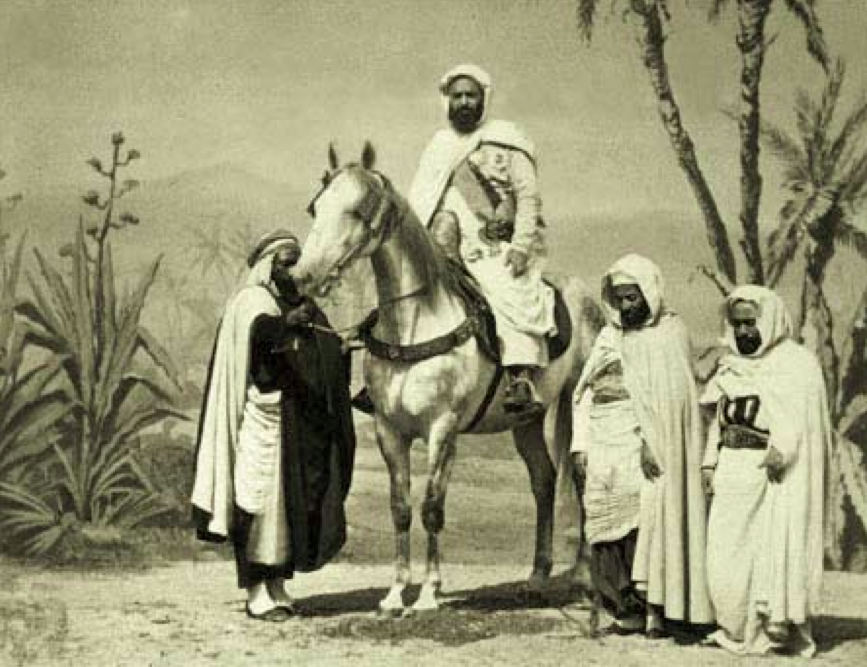
Emir Abdelkader resistance

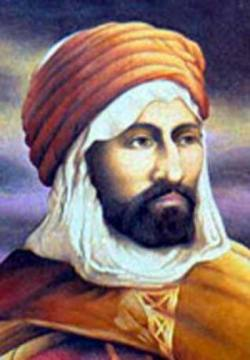
Mokrani Revolt

During the French conquest of Algeria, the region of the current Boumerdès Province in Lower Kabylia was the scene of several battles of Algerian resistance fighters against French Troupes coloniales:

=== French invasion (1830–1870) ===
- Shipwreck of Dellys, which took place on May 15, 1830, as part of the Algerian resistance against French invasion.

The region of the current Boumerdès Province was the first bulwark that faced from 1837 against the French invasion of Kabylia and eastern Algeria through several battles under the banner of the Mitidja resistance and the Emir Abdelkader resistance:

- Expedition of the Col des Beni Aïcha, which took place on May 18, 1837, as part of the Algerian resistance against French invasion.
- First Battle of Boudouaou, which took place on May 25, 1837, as part of the Algerian resistance against French invasion.
- First Battle of the Issers, which took place on May 27, 1837, as part of the Algerian resistance against French invasion.
- First Assault of Dellys, which took place on May 28, 1837, as part of the Algerian resistance against French invasion.
- Ammal battle (1840), which took place on April 18, 1840, as part of the Algerian resistance against French invasion.
- Boudouaou battle (1840), which took place on September 18, 1840, as part of the Algerian resistance against French invasion.
- Second Assault of Dellys, which took place on May 12, 1844, as part of the Algerian resistance against French invasion.
- Battle of the Col des Beni Aïcha (1846), which took place on February 3, 1846, as part of the Algerian resistance against French invasion.

=== Mokrani Revolt (1871) ===
This region was the scene of the last battles of the Mokrani Revolt during the month of April 1871 at the gate of Algiers against the French invasion:

- Naciria battle (1871), which took place on April 17, 1871, as part of the Mokrani Revolt.
- Bordj Menaïel battle (1871), which took place on April 18, 1871, as part of the Mokrani Revolt.
- Issers battle (1871), which took place on April 18, 1871, as part of the Mokrani Revolt.
- Battle of the Col des Beni Aïcha, which took place on April 19, 1871, as part of the Mokrani Revolt.
- Battle of Alma, which took place on April 19, 1871, as part of the Mokrani Revolt.

=== Independence Revolution (1954–1962) ===
This province saw the creation of several clandestine torture centers during the Algerian revolution:

- Ferme Gauthier in Titouna within the commune of Souk El Had.
- Ferme Moll in the commune of Legata.
- Ferme Sabatier in the commune of Si Mustapha.
- Ferme Errol in the commune of Tidjelabine.
- Camp Bastos in the commune of Bordj Menaïel.
- Camp Cortès in the commune of Bordj Menaïel.
- Camp des Sénégalais in the commune of the Zemmouri.
- Camp Germain in the commune of Legata.
- Camp Gualota in the commune of Dellys.
- Camp Ouriacha in the commune of Naciria.
- Camp Stora in the commune of Kharrouba.

== Resistance against Salafist terrorism ==
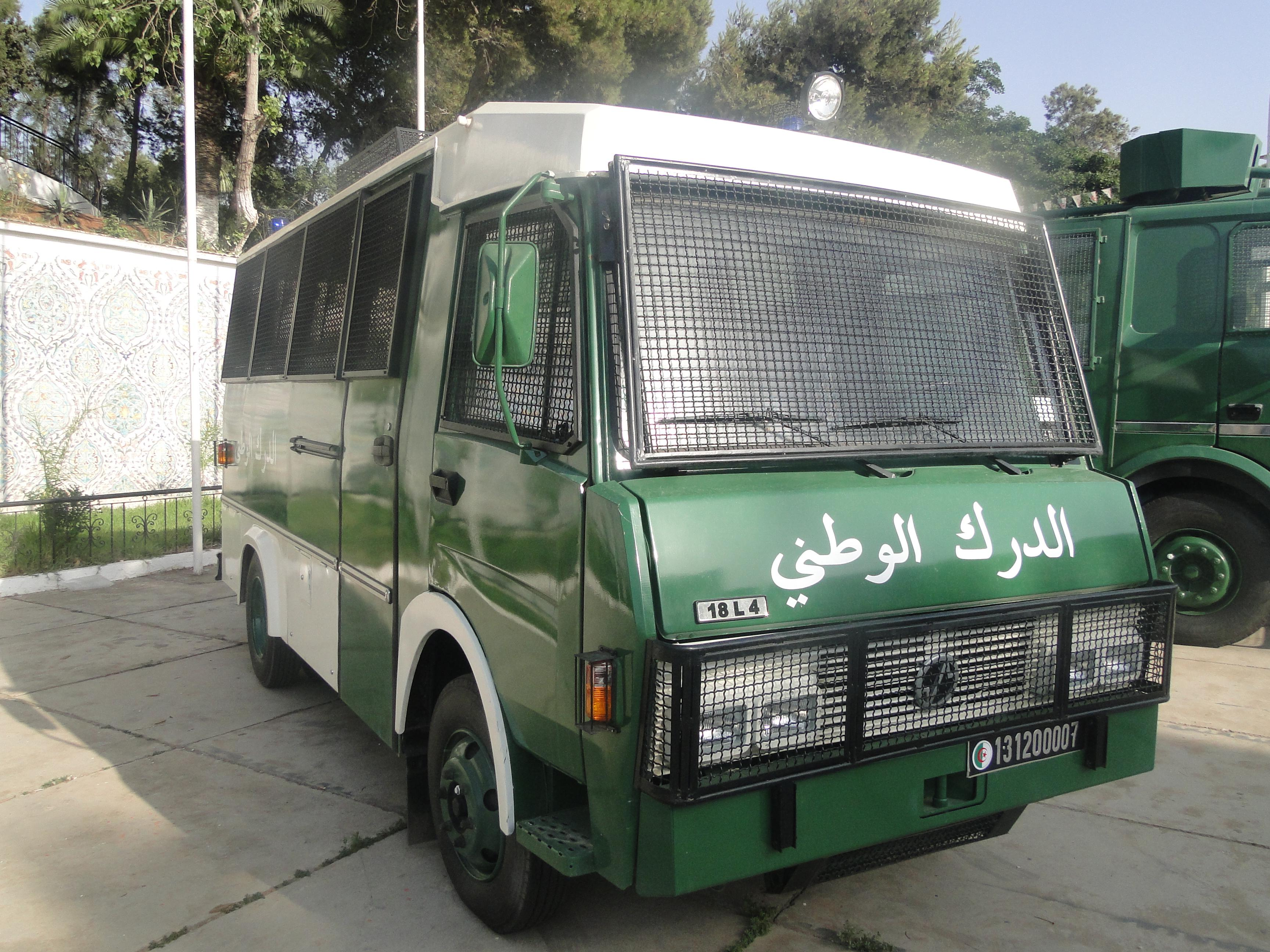
Gendarmerie Nationale

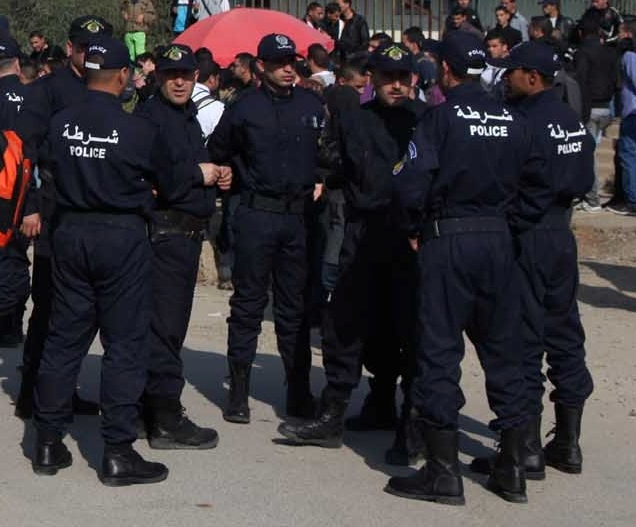
Algerian police

This province has suffered the horrors of dozens of terrorist attacks perpetrated by the Salafist Group for Preaching and Combat (GSPC):

- List of terrorist incidents in 2005
  - 2005 Tidjelabine bombing (July 29, 2005)
- List of terrorist incidents in 2006
  - 2006 Tidjelabine bombing (June 19, 2006)
  - 2006 Boudouaou bombing (August 8, 2006)
- List of terrorist incidents in 2007
  - 2007 Souk El Had bombing (February 13, 2007)
  - 2007 Dellys bombing (September 8, 2007)
- List of terrorist incidents in 2008
  - 2008 Naciria bombing (January 2, 2008)
  - 2008 Thénia bombing (January 29, 2008)
  - 2008 Beni Amrane bombings (June 9, 2008)
  - 2008 Zemmouri bombing (August 9, 2008)
  - 2008 Issers bombing (August 19, 2008)
- List of terrorist incidents in 2010
  - 2010 Tidjelabine bombing (April 7, 2010)
  - 2010 Ammal bombing (June 11, 2010)
  - August 2010 Baghlia bombing (August 18, 2010)
  - 2010 Bordj Menaïel bombing (September 21, 2010)
- List of terrorist incidents in 2012
  - 2012 Thénia bombing (January 11, 2012)
  - 2012 Baghlia bombing (April 29, 2012)

== Walis ==
Many Walis have passed through Boumerdès Province since its creation on February 4, 1984, through Executive Decree No. 84-09 that organizes the Algerian national territory within the framework of forty-eight wilayates.

Chronology of Walis in Boumerdès Province
N°	Wali	From	To	Province of birth
01	Abdelmalek Sellal	April 4, 1984	May 13, 1984	Constantine Province
02	Hachemi Djiar	May 13, 1984	September 20, 1987	Batna Province
03	Youcef ben Oudjit	September 20, 1987	July 29, 1990	Jijel Province
04	Kouider Djebli	July 29, 1990	August 21, 1991	Chlef Province
05	Mohamed Laïchoubi	August 21, 1991	April 15, 1994	Tlemcen Province
06	Mourad Hidouk	June 30, 1994	August 22, 1999	Jijel Province
07	Ali Bedrici	August 22, 1999	May 7, 2008	Tizi Ouzou Province
08	Brahim Merad	May 7, 2008	September 30, 2010	Batna Province
09	Kamal Abbas	September 30, 2010	July 22, 2015	Laghouat Province
10	Nouria Yamina Zerhouni	July 22, 2015	October 5, 2016	Tlemcen Province
11	Abderrahmane Madani Fouatih	October 5, 2016	October 3, 2018	Oran Province
12	Mohamed Slamani	October 3, 2018	April 22, 2019	Biskra Province
13	Yahia Yahiatene	April 22, 2019	Nowadays	Tizi Ouzou Province

== Deputies ==
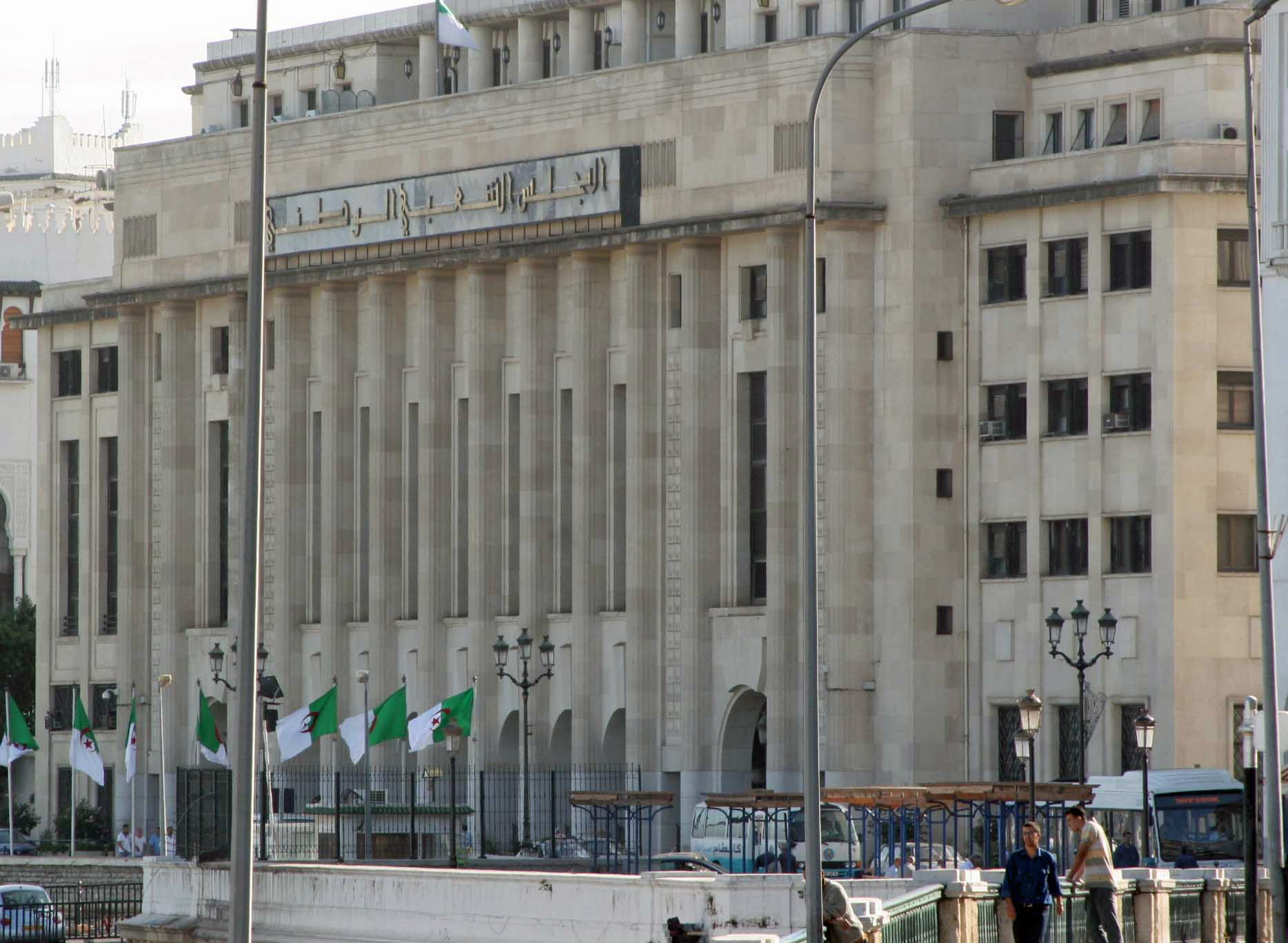
People's National Assembly

The deputies of this province during the legislative elections of May 4, 2017, are:

- Abdelkrim Djanati (Democratic National Rally)
- Ali Laskri (Socialist Forces Front)
- Belkacem Benamar (Socialist Forces Front)
- Hacene Bouzad (Independent)
- Mansour Abdelaziz (Movement of Society for Peace)
- Menouar Djaadi (National Liberation Front)
- Nadia Iheddadene born Amroune (Socialist Forces Front)
- Saliha Mekharef (Democratic National Rally)
- Salima Othmani (National Liberation Front)
- Yahia Mahsas (National Liberation Front)

== Religion ==
=== Mosques ===
- Al-Fath Mosque
- Jabir ibn Hayyan Mosque
- Uthman ibn Affan Mosque
- Abderrahmane ibn Khaldoun Mosque
- Al-Baraka Mosque

=== Zawiyas ===
- Zawiya Thaalibia in the Issers.
- Zawiyet Sidi Amar Cherif in Sidi Daoud.
- Zawiyet Sidi Boumerdassi in Tidjelabine.
- Zawiyet Sidi Boushaki in Thenia.
- Zawiyet Sidi M'Hamed Saadi in Aafir.
- Zawiyet Sidi Ali Debbaghi in Beni Amrane.
- Zawiyet Sidi Ghobrini in Khemis El-Khechna.
- Zawiyet Sidi Salem in Boudouaou.

== Education ==
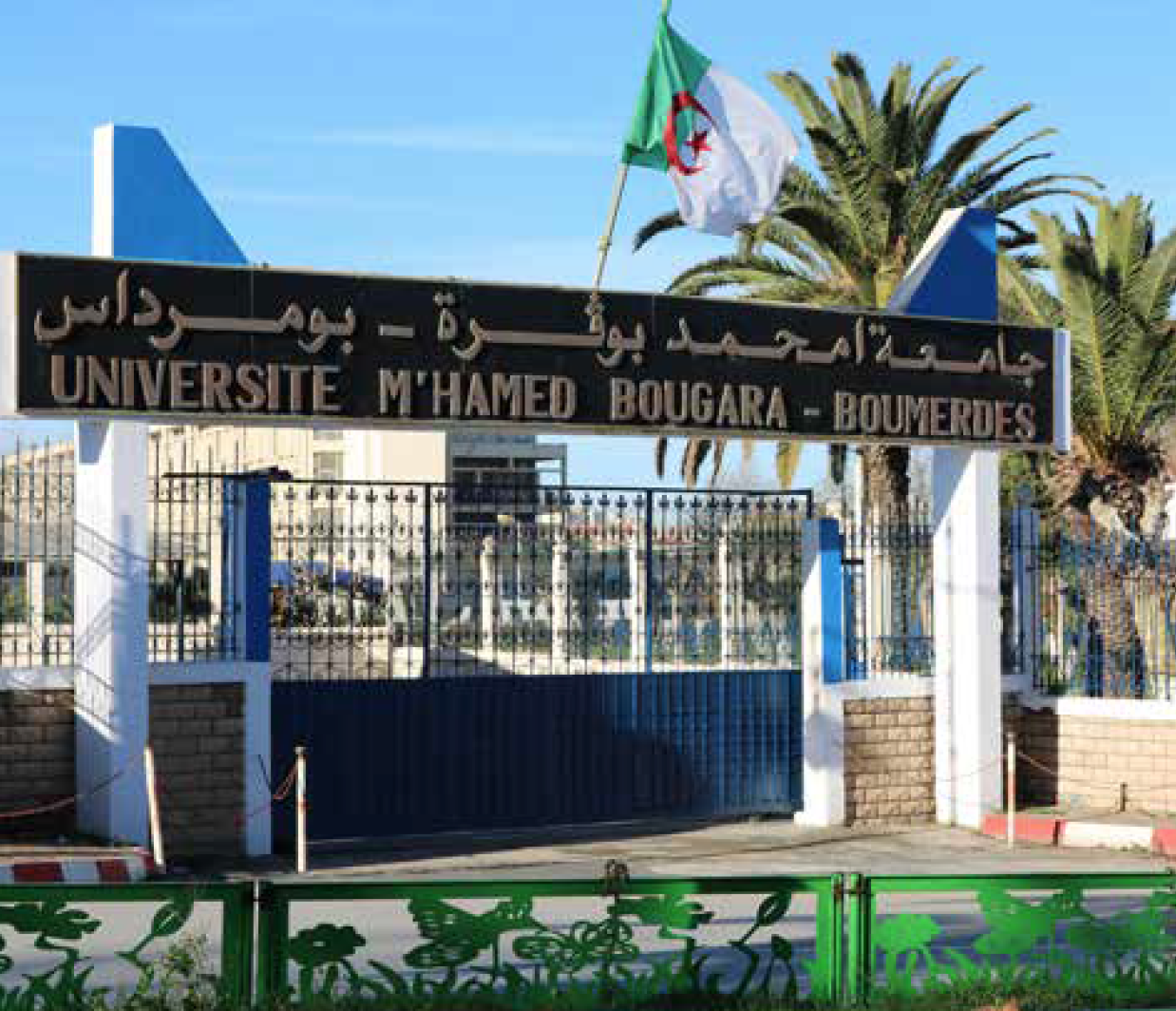
University of Boumerdès

- University of Boumerdès
- Faculty of Boudouaou
- Institut National de la Productivité et du Développement Industriel (INPED)
- Touzout brothers Lyceum
- Ahmed Rahmoune Lyceum
- Mohamed Bouchatal College
- Mohamed Boushaki School
- Draoui brothers Lyceum
- Emir Khaled Lyceum
- Mohamed Laïd Al-Khalifa Lyceum
- Frantz Fanon Lyceum

== Health ==
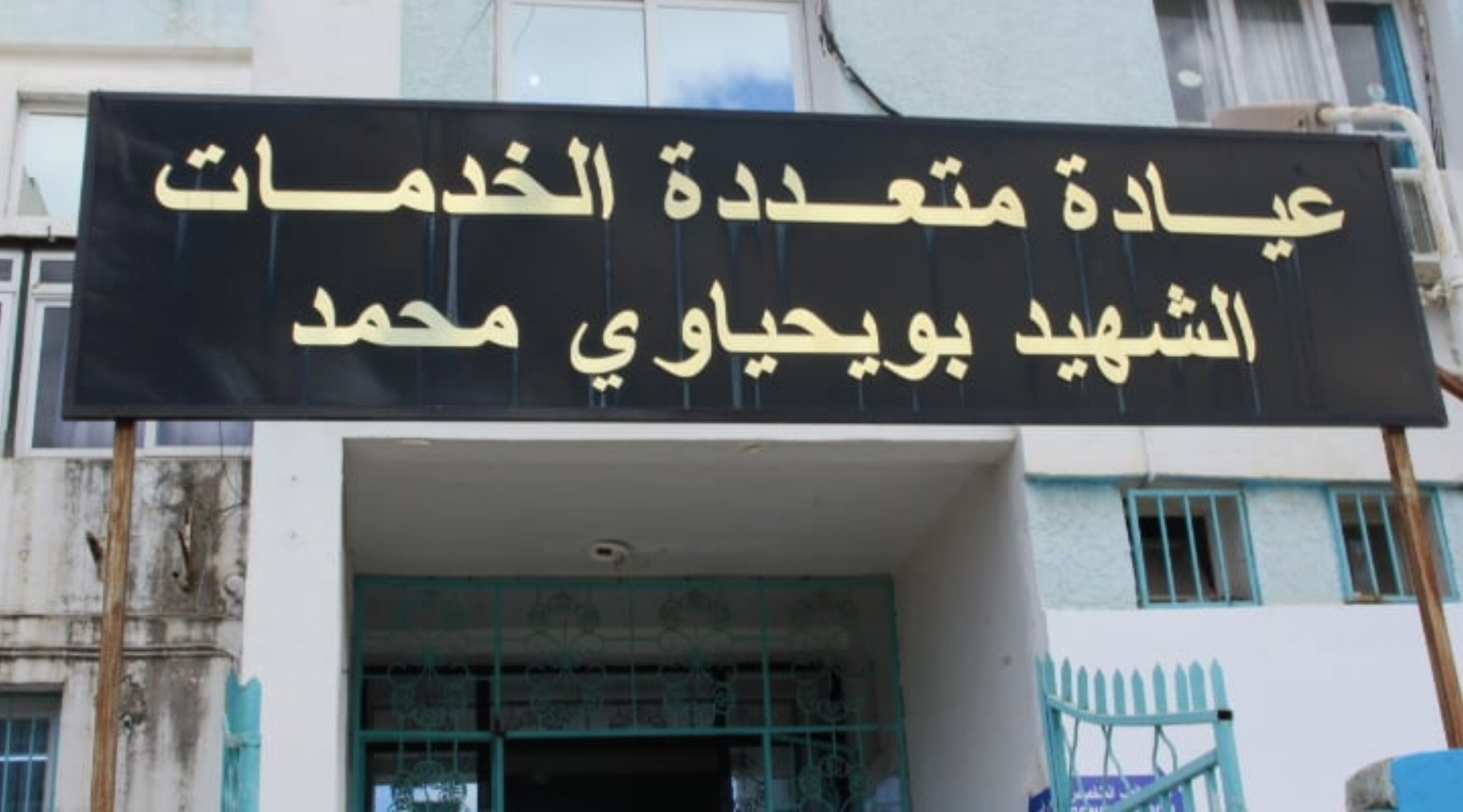
Mohamed Bouyahiaoui Hospital

- Mohamed Bouyahiaoui Hospital
- Thenia Hospital
- Amar Ouamrane Hospital
- Mohamed Boudaoud Hospital
- Boumerdès Orthopedic Emergency Hospital
- Boumerdès Hospital

== Tourism ==
=== Hotels ===
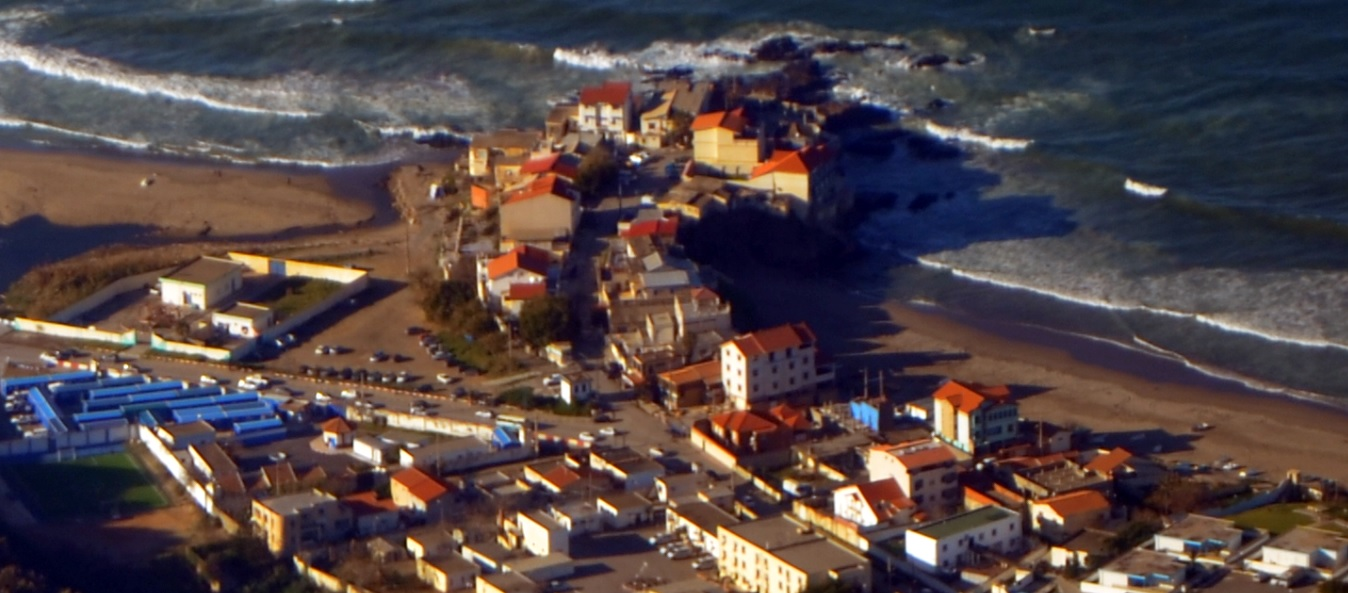
Site of Le Rocher Hotel

- Albatros Beach Hotel
- El Amir Hotel
- La Villa Hotel
- Le Rocher Hotel
- Leïla Hotel
- Medina Hotel
- Soummam Hotel
- Timezrit Hotel

=== Beaches ===
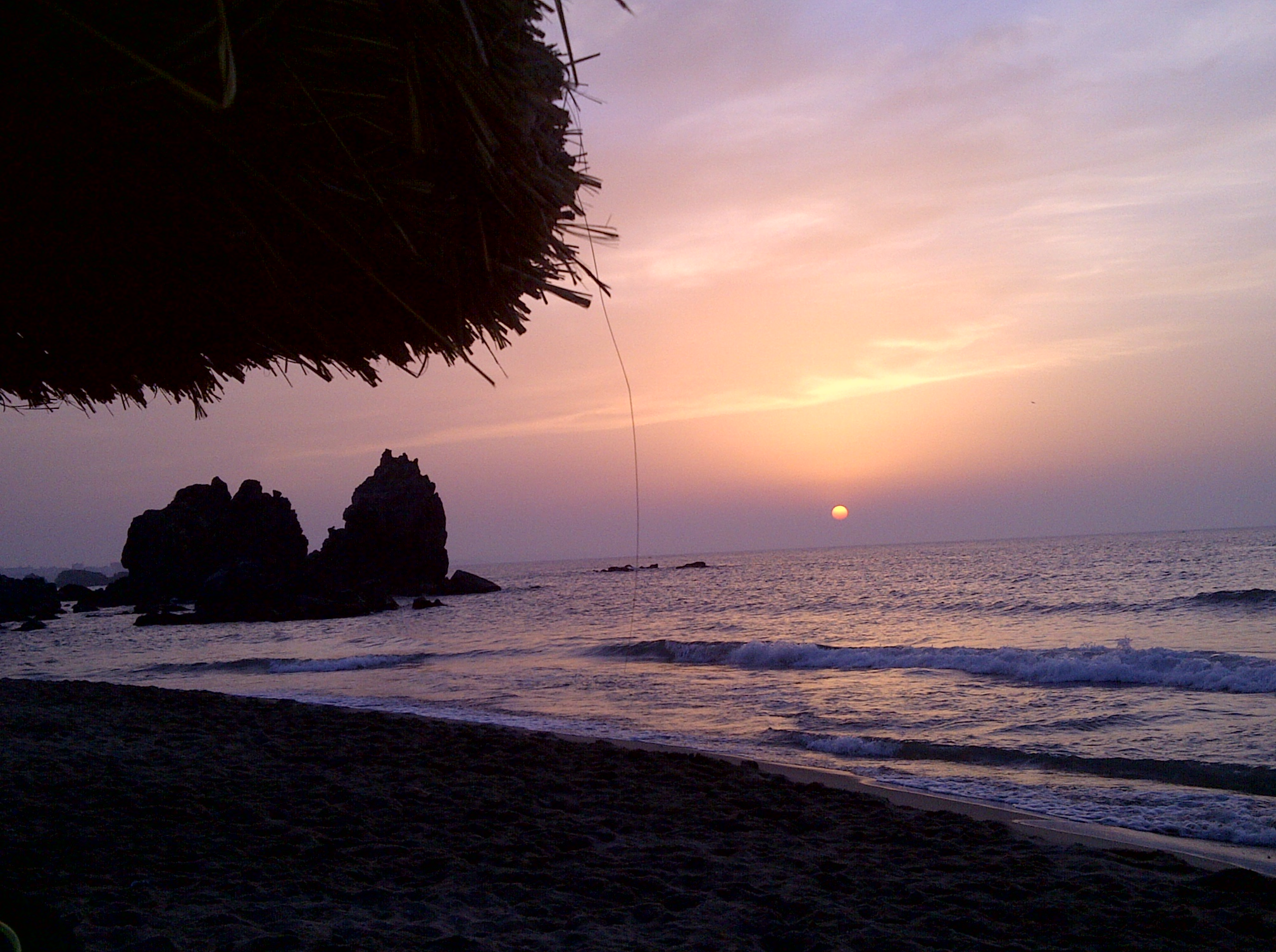
El Karma Beach

- Seghirat Beach
- El Karma Beach
- Nakhlat Beach
- Miflah Beach
- Echatt Beach
- Corso Beach
- Souanine Beach
- Leghata Beach
- Aafir Beach

== Transport ==
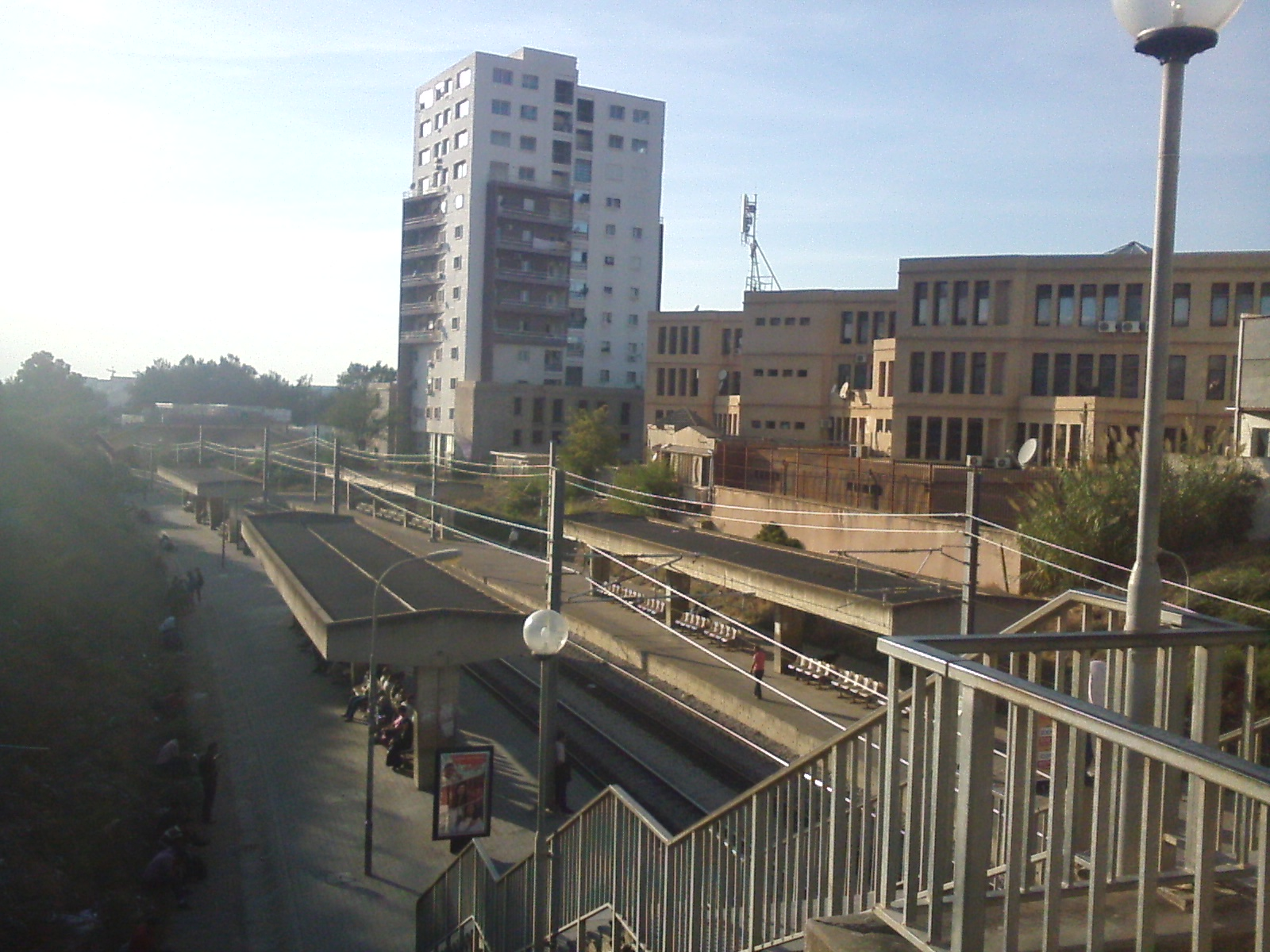
Boumerdès railway station

- Ammal railway station
- Beni Amrane railway station
- Bordj Menaïel railway station
- Boudouaou railway station
- Boumerdès railway station
- Corso railway station
- Issers railway station
- Naciria railway station
- Si Mustapha railway station
- Souk El Had railway station
- Thenia railway station
- Tidjelabine railway station
- Boumerdès bus station

== Transport accidents ==
- 2011 Boudouaou rail accident (August 22, 2011)

== Ports ==
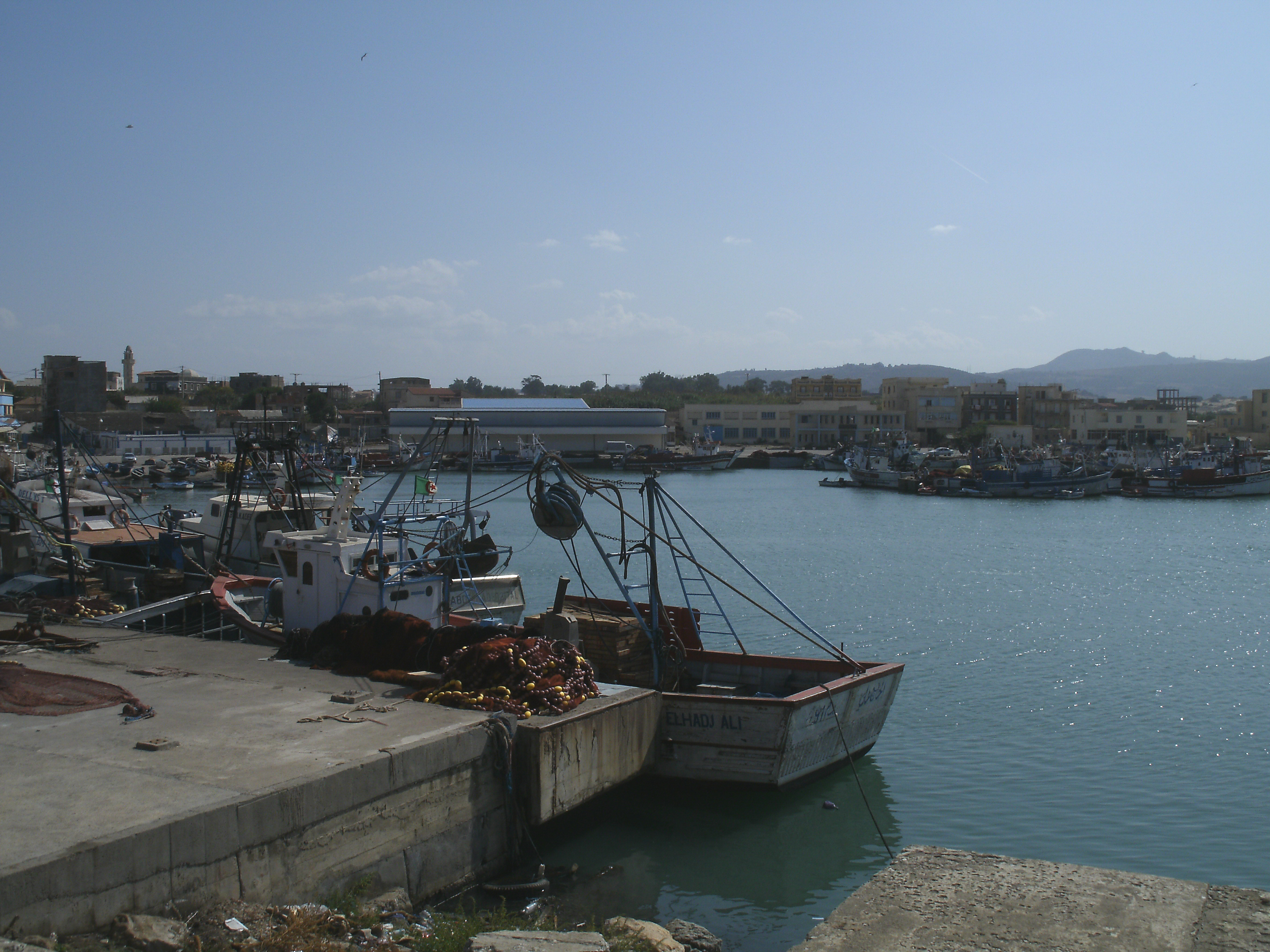
Zemmouri Port

This province is home to the structures of several fishing ports:

- Dellys Port
- Djinet Port
- Zemmouri Port
- Al-Qaous fishing shelter

== Rivers ==
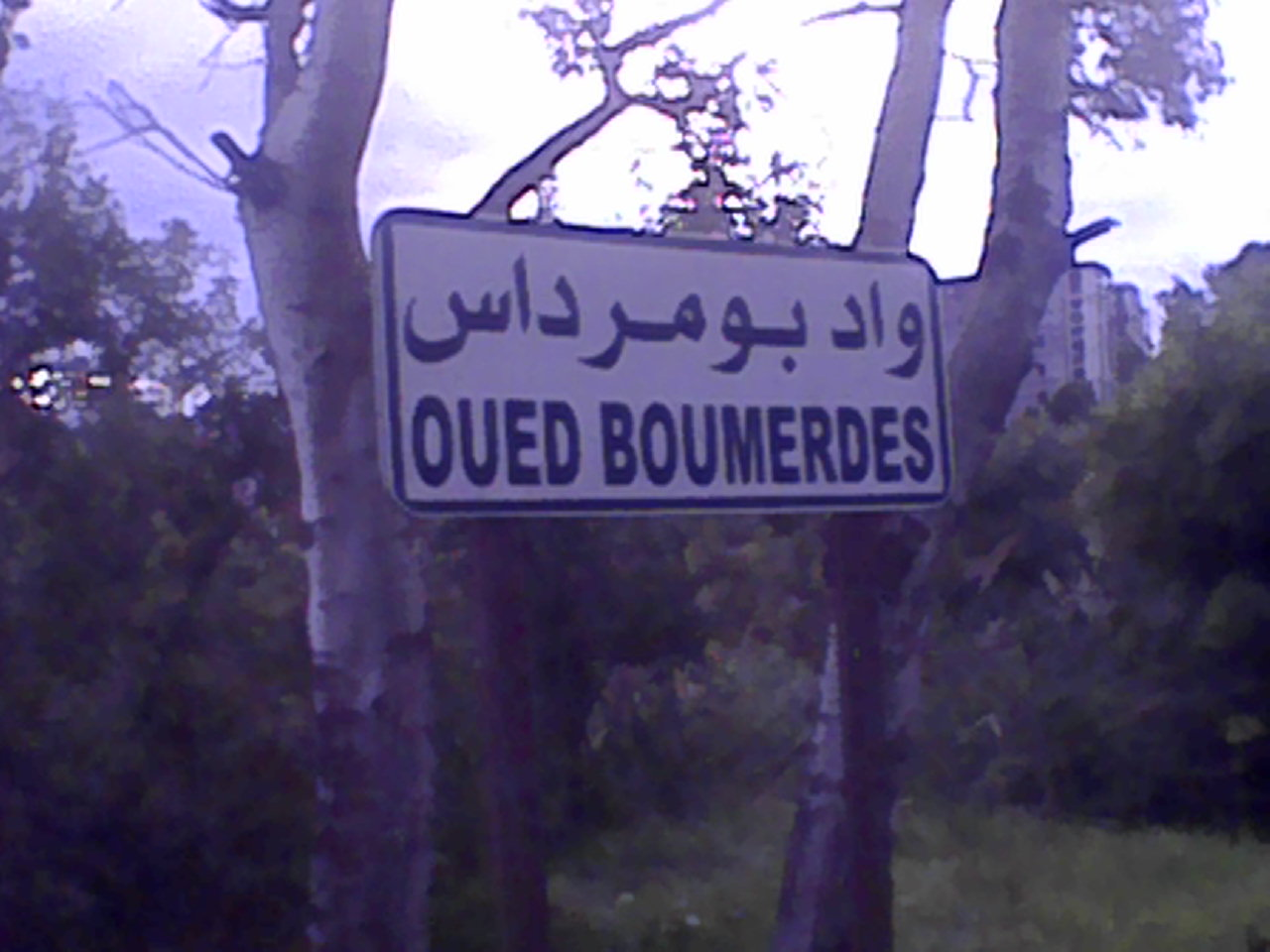
Boumerdès River

This province is crossed by dozens of rivers:

- Amara River
- Arbia River
- Beni Arab River
- Boudouaou River
- Boumerdès River
- Chender River
- Corso River
- Djemâa River
- Gheraba River
- Hamiz River
- Isser River
- Karma River
- Keddache River
- Keddara River
- Lahsar River
- Larbâa River
- Menaïel River
- Meraldene River
- Oubay River
- Réghaïa River
- Sebaou River
- Sidi Ali River
- Tatarig River

== Dams ==
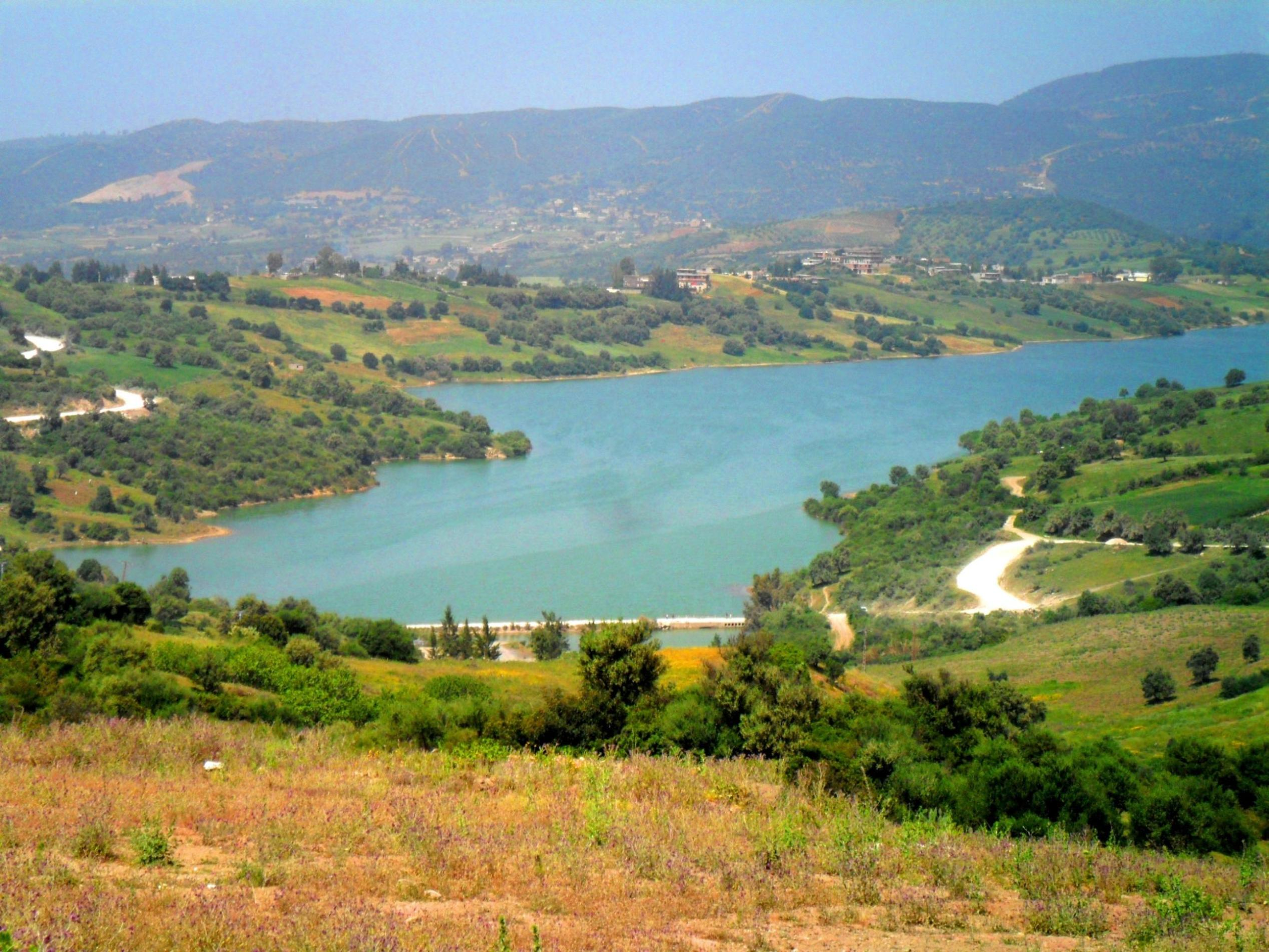
Keddara Dam

This province is home to the structures of several hydraulic dams:

- Keddara Dam
- Meraldene Dam
- Beni Amrane Dam
- Chender Dam
- Djinet Dam
- El Allal Dam
- Hamiz Dam
- Merdjet El Feïat Dam
- Oued Djemaa Dam
- Sidi Daoud Dam

== Sport ==
The municipalities of this province are home to several sports clubs, especially football, including:

- CMB Thénia
- IB Khemis El Khachna
- JS Bordj Ménaïel
- RC Boumerdes
- CR Issers
- ES Baghlia
- ESM Boudouaou
- JS Naciria
- US Dellys

== Notable people ==
- Sidi Abd al-Rahman al-Tha'alibi, Algerian theologian.
- Sidi Boushaki, Algerian theologian.
- Cheikh Boumerdassi, Algerian theologian.
- Sidi Amar Cherif, Algerian theologian.
- Abdelkader Zerrar, Algerian footballer.
- Abdelkrim Doudène, Algerian footballer.
- Abdenour Boushaki, Algerian politician.
- Abderrahmane Abdelli, Algerian artist.
- Abderrahmane Benhamida, Algerian politician.
- Abderrahmane Boushaki, Algerian leader.
- Abderrahmane Farès, Algerian politician.
- Abderrahmane Hammad, Algerian athlete.
- Abderrahman Ibrir, Algerian footballer.
- Adel Djerrar, Algerian footballer.
- Ahmed Bourenane, Algerian politician.
- Ahmed Hadhoum, Algerian politician.
- Ahmed Mahsas, Algerian politician.
- Ali Boushaki, Algerian theologian.
- Ali Bouyahiaoui, Algerian militant
- Ali Laskri, Algerian politician.
- Ali Rial, Algerian footballer.
- Amine ibn El Boushaki, Algerian judoka.
- Bilal Tarikat, Algerian footballer.
- Boualem Boukacem, Algerian artist.
- Brahim Boushaki, Algerian theologian.
- Dahmane Deriche, Algerian politician.
- Dahmane Deriche, Algerian artist.
- Faouzi Chaouchi, Algerian footballer.
- Farid Ishak Boushaki, Algerian academician.
- Farouk Belkaïd, Algerian footballer.
- Fatma Zohra Zamoum, Algerian writer.
- Feriel Boushaki, Algerian artist.
- Firmus, Berber leader.
- Fodil Mezali, an Algerian journalist.
- Gildo, Berber leader.
- Habib Ayyoub, Algerian writer.
- Hocine Mezali, Algerian journalist.
- Hocine Soltani, Algerian boxer.
- Hocine Ziani, Algerian artist.
- Lamine Abid, Algerian footballer.
- Lounés Bendahmane, Algerian footballer.
- Lyès Deriche, Algerian leader.
- Maamar Bettayeb, Algerian academician.
- Mascezel, Berber leader.
- Messaoud Aït Abderrahmane, Algerian footballer.
- Mohamed Aïchaoui, Algerian journalist.
- Mohamed Allalou, Algerian boxer.
- Mohamed Arkab, Algerian politician.
- Mohamed ben Zamoum, Algerian leader
- Mohamed Bouisri, Algerian politician.
- Mohamed Boumerdassi, Algerian artist.
- Mohamed Bourenane, Algerian politician.
- Mohamed Bouyahiaoui, Algerian militant.
- Mohamed Cherak, Algerian journalist.
- Mohamed Deriche, Algerian politician.
- Mohamed Deriche, Algerian academician.
- Mohamed Flissi, Algerian boxer.
- Mohamed Hassaïne, Algerian journalist.
- Mohamed Hattab, Algerian politician.
- Mohamed Mechkarini, Algerian militant.
- Mohamed Missouri, Algerian boxer.
- Mohamed Nassim Boushaki, Algerian academician.
- Mohamed Rahmoune, Algerian politician.
- Mohamed Seghir Boushaki, Algerian politician.
- Mohamed Seghir Ferradji, Algerian footballer.
- Mokhtar Hasbellaoui, Algerian academician.
- Mustapha Ishak Boushaki, Algerian academician.
- Mustapha Toumi, Algerian songwriter.
- Nadia Boumerdassi, Algerian artist.
- Noureddine Melikechi, Algerian physicist.
- Nubel, Berber leader.
- Omar ben Zamoum, Algerian leader.
- Omar Fetmouche, Algerian artist.
- Othmane Senadjki, Algerian journalist.
- Rabah Kheliff, Algerian military.
- Rachid Deriche, Algerian academician.
- Rachid Mimouni, Algerian writer.
- Rachid Nadji, Algerian footballer.
- Raïs Hamidou, Algerian privateer.
- Ratiba Tariket, Algerian judokate.
- Rezki Zerarti, Algerian artist.
- Salah Bouchatal, Algerian politician.
- Salem Anou, Algerian politician.
- Salem Mouhamou, Algerian politician.
- Shahnez Boushaki, Algerian basketball player.
- Smaïl Bouarous, Algerian marathon runner.
- Soufiane Lahouassa, Algerian footballer.
- Tarek Boushaki, Algerian academician.
- Walid Derrardja, Algerian footballer.
- Yahia Boushaki (Shahid), Algerian politician.
- Zinedine Ferhat, Algerian footballer.
