= Talilt =

- Nickname: Aït Si Ali
- Motto: تاليلت
- Interactive map of Talilt
- Commune: Beni Amrane
- District: Thénia District
- Province: Boumerdès Province
- Region: Kabylie
- Country: Algeria Algeria

Area
  - Total: 3.5 km^{2} (1.4 sq mi)

Dimensions
  - Length: 2 km (1.2 mi)
  - Width: 1.75 km (1.09 mi)
- Elevation: 490 m (1,610 ft)
- Time zone: UTC+01:00
- Area code: 35006

Talilt or Aït Si Ali is a village in the Boumerdès Province in Kabylie, Algeria.

== Location ==
The village is surrounded by Meraldene River, Isser River and Boumerdès River and the towns of Beni Amrane and Thénia in the Khachna mountain range.
