= Aït Afra =

- Motto: آيت عفرة
- Interactive map of Aït Afra
- Commune: Ammal
- District: Thénia District
- Province: Boumerdès Province
- Region: Kabylie
- Country: Algeria Algeria

Area
  - Total: 2 km^{2} (0.77 sq mi)

Dimensions
  - Length: 1 km (0.62 mi)
  - Width: 2 km (1.2 mi)
- Elevation: 380 m (1,250 ft)
- Time zone: UTC+01:00
- Area code: 35006

Aït Afra is a village in the Boumerdès Province in Kabylie, Algeria.

== Location ==
The village is surrounded by Isser River and the town of Ammal in the Khachna mountain range.
