= Hini =

- Motto: هيني
- Interactive map of Hini
- Commune: Ammal
- District: Thénia District
- Province: Boumerdès Province
- Region: Kabylie
- Country: Algeria Algeria

Area
  - Total: 2.2 km^{2} (0.85 sq mi)

Dimensions
  - Length: 1.1 km (0.68 mi)
  - Width: 2 km (1.2 mi)
- Elevation: 350 m (1,150 ft)
- Time zone: UTC+01:00
- Area code: 35006

Hini is a village in the Boumerdès Province in Kabylie, Algeria.

== Location ==
The village is surrounded by Isser River and the town of Ammal in the Khachna mountain range.
