= Bouchelaghem =

- Motto: بوشلاغم
- Interactive map of Bouchelaghem
- Commune: Beni Amrane
- District: Thénia District
- Province: Boumerdès Province
- Region: Kabylie
- Country: Algeria Algeria

Area
  - Total: 8 km^{2} (3.1 sq mi)

Dimensions
  - Length: 4 km (2.5 mi)
  - Width: 2 km (1.2 mi)
- Elevation: 380 m (1,250 ft)
- Time zone: UTC+01:00
- Area code: 35006

Bouchelaghem is a village in the Boumerdès Province in Kabylie, Algeria.

== Location ==
The village is surrounded by Isser River and the town of Beni Amrane in the Khachna mountain range.
