= Aït Hamadouche =

- Nicknames: Beni Hamadouche, Ait Hamadouche, Bouhamadouche, Bouhmadouche, Hamadouche, Hamdouche
- Motto: آيت حمادوش,بني حمادوش ،حماادوش , بوحمادوش
- Interactive map of Aït Hamadouche
- Commune: Souk El-Had
- District: Thénia District
- Province: Boumerdès Province
- Region: Kabylie
- Country: Algeria Algeria

Area
  - Total: 3 km^{2} (1.2 sq mi)

Dimensions
  - Length: 1.5 km (0.93 mi)
  - Width: 2 km (1.2 mi)
- Elevation: 480 m (1,570 ft)
- Time zone: UTC+01:00
- Area code: 35020

Aït Hamadouche or Beni Hamadouche is a village Ait Aïcha in the Province Boumerdes in Kabylie, Algeria.

== Location ==
The village is surrounded by Isser River and Meraldene River and the towns of Souk El-Had, Thénia / Tizi-Nait-Aicha and Beni Amrane in the Khachna mountain range.

== Gallery ==
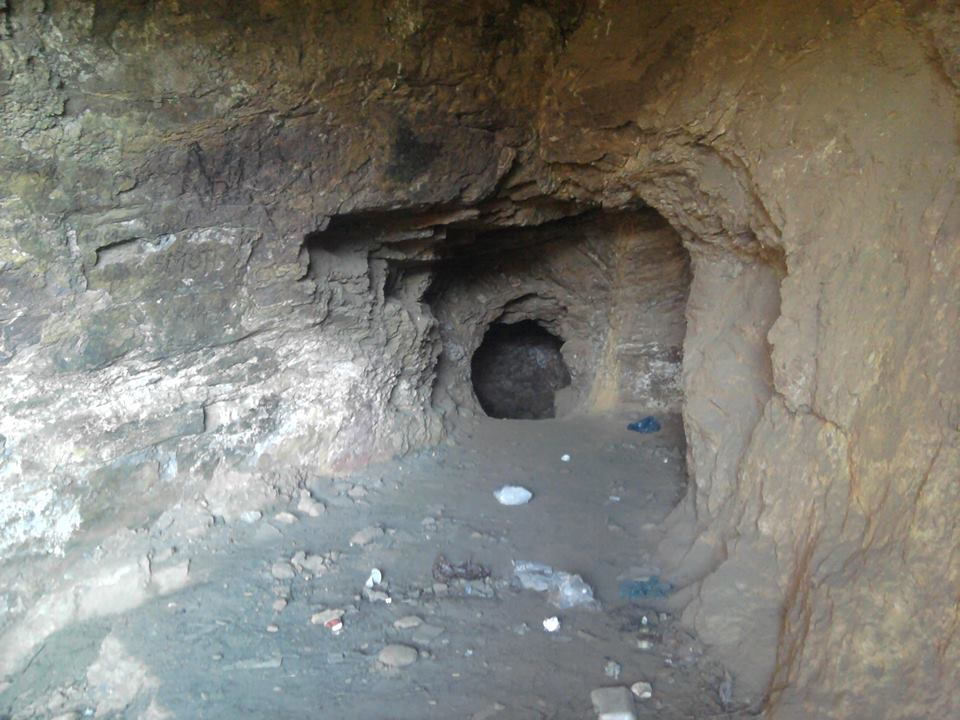
Caves of Grotte Aït HamadoucheBni hamadouche
