= Touzaline =

- Motto: توزالين
- Interactive map of Touzaline
- Commune: Beni Amrane
- District: Thénia District
- Province: Boumerdès Province
- Region: Kabylie
- Country: Algeria Algeria

Area
  - Total: 6 km^{2} (2.3 sq mi)

Dimensions
  - Length: 3 km (1.9 mi)
  - Width: 2 km (1.2 mi)
- Elevation: 530 m (1,740 ft)
- Time zone: UTC+01:00
- Area code: 35006

Touzaline is a village in the Boumerdès Province in Kabylie, Algeria.

== Location ==
The village is surrounded by Isser River and the town of Beni Amrane in the Khachna mountain range.
