= Bou Ismaïl, Boumerdès =

Bou Ismaïl
- Nickname: Bousmaïl
- Motto: بوسماعيل
- Interactive map of Bou Ismaïl
- Commune: Ammal
- District: Thénia District
- Province: Boumerdès Province
- Region: Kabylie
- Country: Algeria Algeria

Area
  - Total: 2.6 km^{2} (1.0 sq mi)

Dimensions
  - Length: 1.3 km (0.81 mi)
  - Width: 2 km (1.2 mi)
- Elevation: 570 m (1,870 ft)
- Time zone: UTC+01:00
- Area code: 35006

Bou Ismaïl or Bousmaïl is a village in the Boumerdès Province in Kabylie, Algeria.

== Location ==
The village is surrounded by Isser River and the town of Ammal in the Khachna mountain range.
