= Ouled Djerrah =

- Motto: أولاد جراح
- Interactive map of Ouled Djerrah
- Commune: Ammal
- District: Thénia District
- Province: Boumerdès Province
- Region: Kabylie
- Country: Algeria Algeria

Area
  - Total: 6.2 km^{2} (2.4 sq mi)

Dimensions
  - Length: 2 km (1.2 mi)
  - Width: 3.1 km (1.9 mi)
- Elevation: 630 m (2,070 ft)
- Time zone: UTC+01:00
- Area code: 35006

Ouled Djerrah is a village in the Boumerdès Province in Kabylie, Algeria.

== Location ==
The village is surrounded by Isser River and the town of Ammal in the Khachna mountain range.
