= Bouredjouane =

- Motto: بورجوان
- Interactive map of Bouredjouane
- Commune: Beni Amrane
- District: Thénia District
- Province: Boumerdès Province
- Region: Kabylie
- Country: Algeria Algeria

Area
  - Total: 4.4 km^{2} (1.7 sq mi)

Dimensions
  - Length: 2 km (1.2 mi)
  - Width: 2.2 km (1.4 mi)
- Elevation: 470 m (1,540 ft)
- Time zone: UTC+01:00
- Area code: 35006

Bouredjouane is a village in the Boumerdès Province in Kabylie, Algeria.

== Location ==
The village is surrounded by Meraldene River, Isser River and Boumerdès River and the towns of Beni Amrane and Thénia in the Khachna mountain range.
