= Ammal =

- Commune and town
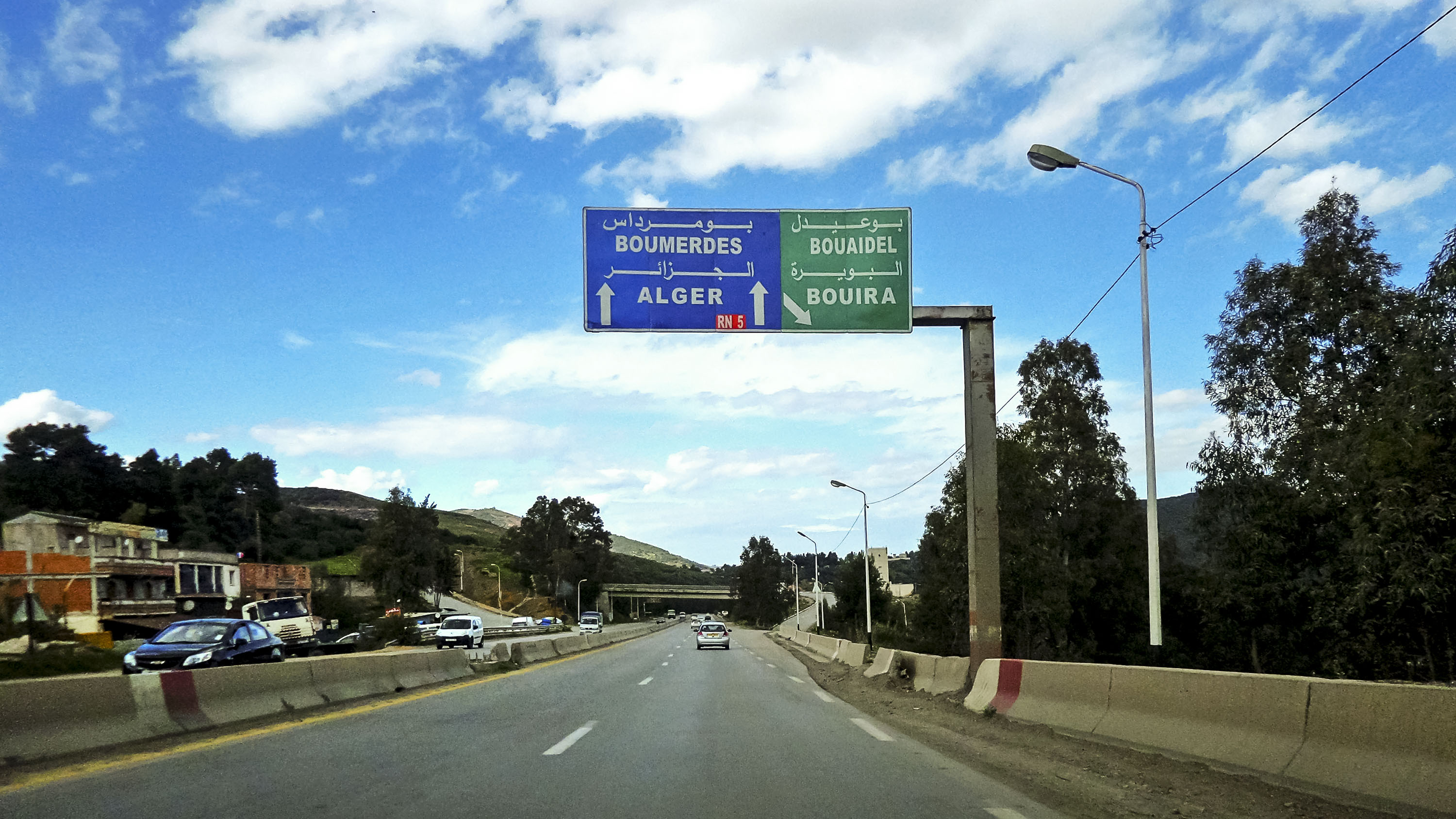

- Location within Algeria
- Country: Algeria
- Province: Boumerdès Province

Population (1998)
  - Total: 8,567
- Time zone: UTC+1 (CET)

Ammal is a town and commune in Boumerdès Province, Algeria. According to the 1998 census it has a population of 8,567.

== Villages ==
The villages of the commune of Ammal are:

- A
  - Aït Abdelhadi
  - Aït Afra
  - Aït Dahmane
  - Aït Salah
  - Aït Si Amar
- B
  - Bou Ismaïl
  - Bouaïdel
- D
  - Doukane
- H
  - Hini
- O
  - Ouled Bellemou
  - Ouled Djerrah
- T
  - Tachehat
  - Thellath
  - Tigrine
  - Tijijga
  - Timizar
  - Tiza
- Z
  - Zenina

== History ==
=== French conquest ===
- Expedition of the Col des Beni Aïcha (1837)
- First Battle of the Issers (1837)
- Battle Of Ammal (1840)
- Battle of the Col des Beni Aïcha (1871)

=== Algerian Revolution ===
- Ferme Gauthier

=== Salafist terrorism ===
- 2010 Ammal bombing (11 June 2010)

== Rivers ==
This commune is crossed by several rivers:

- Isser River

== Football clubs ==
| Club | Division | Level | Location | Logo |
|---|---|---|---|---|
| CS Ammal | Ligue de Football de la Wilaya | 5 | Ammal | |

== Notable people ==
- Mohamed Arkab, Algerian politician.
