= Mezala =

- Motto: مزالة
- Interactive map of Mezala
- Coordinates: 36.7042934°N 3.529542°E
- Commune: Thénia
- District: Thénia District
- Province: Boumerdès Province
- Region: Kabylie
- Country: Algeria Algeria

Area
  - Total: 4 km^{2} (1.5 sq mi)

Dimensions
  - Length: 2 km (1.2 mi)
  - Width: 2 km (1.2 mi)
- Elevation: 420 m (1,380 ft)
- Time zone: UTC+01:00
- Area code: 35005
- Website: thenia.net

Mezala is a village in the Boumerdès Province in Kabylie, Algeria.

== Location ==
The village is surrounded by Meraldene River and the town of Thenia in the Khachna mountain range.

== Notable people ==
- Fodil Mezali, an Algerian journalist and writer
