= Nouria Yamina Zerhouni =

Algerian politician

- Citizenship: Algerian
- Occupation: Politician
- Office: Governor of Boumerdès Province (2015–2018); Minister of Tourism (2013–2015)

Nouria Yamina Zerhouni is an Algerian politician who served as governor of Boumerdès Province between 2015 and 2018.

== Career ==
Zerhouni was appointed Minister of Tourism by president Abdelaziz Bouteflika in September 2013. In July 2015, she became governor of Bourmerdès.
