= Ouled Bessa =

- Motto: أولاد بسة
- Interactive map of Ouled Bessa
- Coordinates: 36.7528844°N 3.5579788°E
- Commune: Thénia
- District: Thénia District
- Province: Boumerdès Province
- Region: Kabylie
- Country: Algeria Algeria

Area
  - Total: 4 km^{2} (1.5 sq mi)

Dimensions
  - Length: 2 km (1.2 mi)
  - Width: 2 km (1.2 mi)
- Elevation: 430 m (1,410 ft)
- Time zone: UTC+01:00
- Area code: 35005
- Website: thenia.net

Ouled Bessa is a village in the Boumerdès Province in Kabylie, Algeria.

== Location ==
The village is surrounded by Keddache River and the towns of Thenia and Zemmouri in the Khachna mountain range.
