= Sidi Fredj, Boumerdès =

Sidi Fredj
- Motto: سيدي فرج
- Interactive map of Sidi Fredj
- Coordinates: 36.7523061°N 3.5915401°E
- Commune: Thénia
- District: Thénia District
- Province: Boumerdès Province
- Region: Kabylie
- Country: Algeria Algeria

Area
  - Total: 3.5 km^{2} (1.4 sq mi)

Dimensions
  - Length: 1.75 km (1.09 mi)
  - Width: 2 km (1.2 mi)
- Elevation: 450 m (1,480 ft)
- Time zone: UTC+01:00
- Area code: 35005
- Website: thenia.net

Sidi Fredj is a village in the Boumerdès Province in Kabylie, Algeria.

== Location ==
The village is surrounded by Keddache River and the towns of Thenia and Zemmouri in the Khachna mountain range.
