= Fekhara =

Village in the Boumerdès Province in Algeria

Coordinates: 36.6928995°N 3.5712391°E

Fekhara or Ifekharene is a village in the Boumerdès Province in Kabylie, Algeria.

== Location ==
The village is surrounded by Soumâa and the town of Thenia in the Khachna mountain range.
