= Mohamed Laïchoubi =

Algerian politician

Mohamed Laichoubi was the Algerian minister for labour and social affairs in the 1995 government of Mokdad Sifi.
