= 2008 Beni Amrane bombings =

Terrorist train bombings in Bourmerdès Province, Algeria

- Boumerdès Province highlighted within Algeria
- Location: Beni Amrane, Boumerdès Province, Algeria
- Date: June 9, 2008 (UTC+1)
- Target: Civilians (1st blast), first responders (2nd blast)
- Attack type: Bombing
- Deaths: 13
- Perpetrator: al-Qaeda Organization in the Islamic Maghreb (suspected)

The 2008 Beni Amrane bombings were two bombings on June 9, 2008, that killed 13 people in the town of Beni Amrane in the Boumerdès Province, 50 km (31 mi) from Algiers, the capital of Algeria. The first bomb killed a French citizen and his Algerian driver as they were leaving the town's railway station. The second device exploded about five minutes later as rescue workers arrived. Eight soldiers and three firefighters died in the second blast while an unconfirmed number of people suffered injuries. Both devices appeared to have been detonated remotely. No group has claimed the bombings, which follow attacks blamed on the al-Qaeda Organization in the Islamic Maghreb group. The Frenchman was an engineer working for a French firm on a renovation project at the station.

== International reactions ==
=== Countries ===
- France – The French Foreign Minister Bernard Kouchner condemned the attack. "I want to express my feeling of disgust and my absolute condemnation of this blind terrorist violence that nothing can justify".

== See also ==
- Terrorist bombings in Algeria
- Insurgency in the Maghreb (2002–present)
- List of terrorist incidents, 2008
