= Gueraïchene =

Coordinates: 36.6948682°N 3.5785139°E

Gueraïchene or Igueraïchene is a village in the Boumerdès Province in Kabylie, Algeria.

== Location ==
The village is surrounded by Soumâa and the town of Thenia in the Khachna mountain range.
