= Isser River =

River in Algeria

Coordinates: 36°50′21″N 3°40′04″E

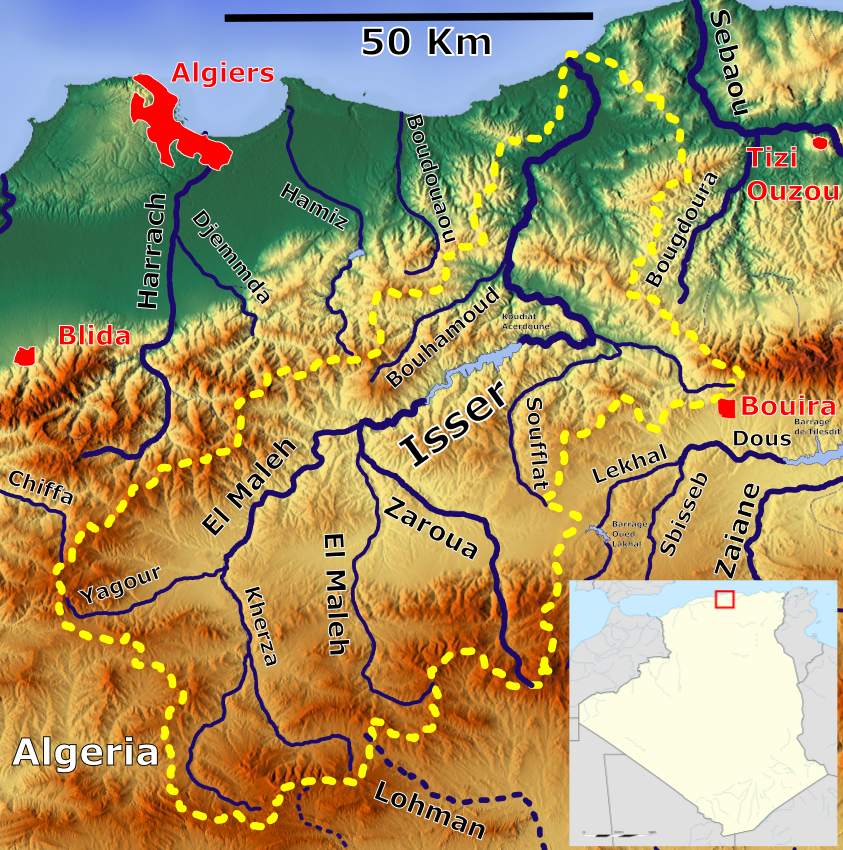
Isser River Basin

The Oued Isser (Kabyle: Asif n Yesser), is a river of Algeria. It begins in Médéa Province, is the main river, with Oued Sébaou of the Medea, which runs through the Lower Kabylie of Djurdjura (or the current province of Boumerdès) Wilaya of Bouira, then flows into the Mediterranean near the coastal town of Djinet in Lower Kabylia, attached to the province of Boumerdes.

The Oued Isser derives its name from the Roman name Serbetes, but other documentary sources give the name Serbetes to the Oued Sébaou.

The hydronymy of the Oued Isser is very interesting from the point of view of the various linguistic appellations that designate it (Berber, Latin, Arabic and French).

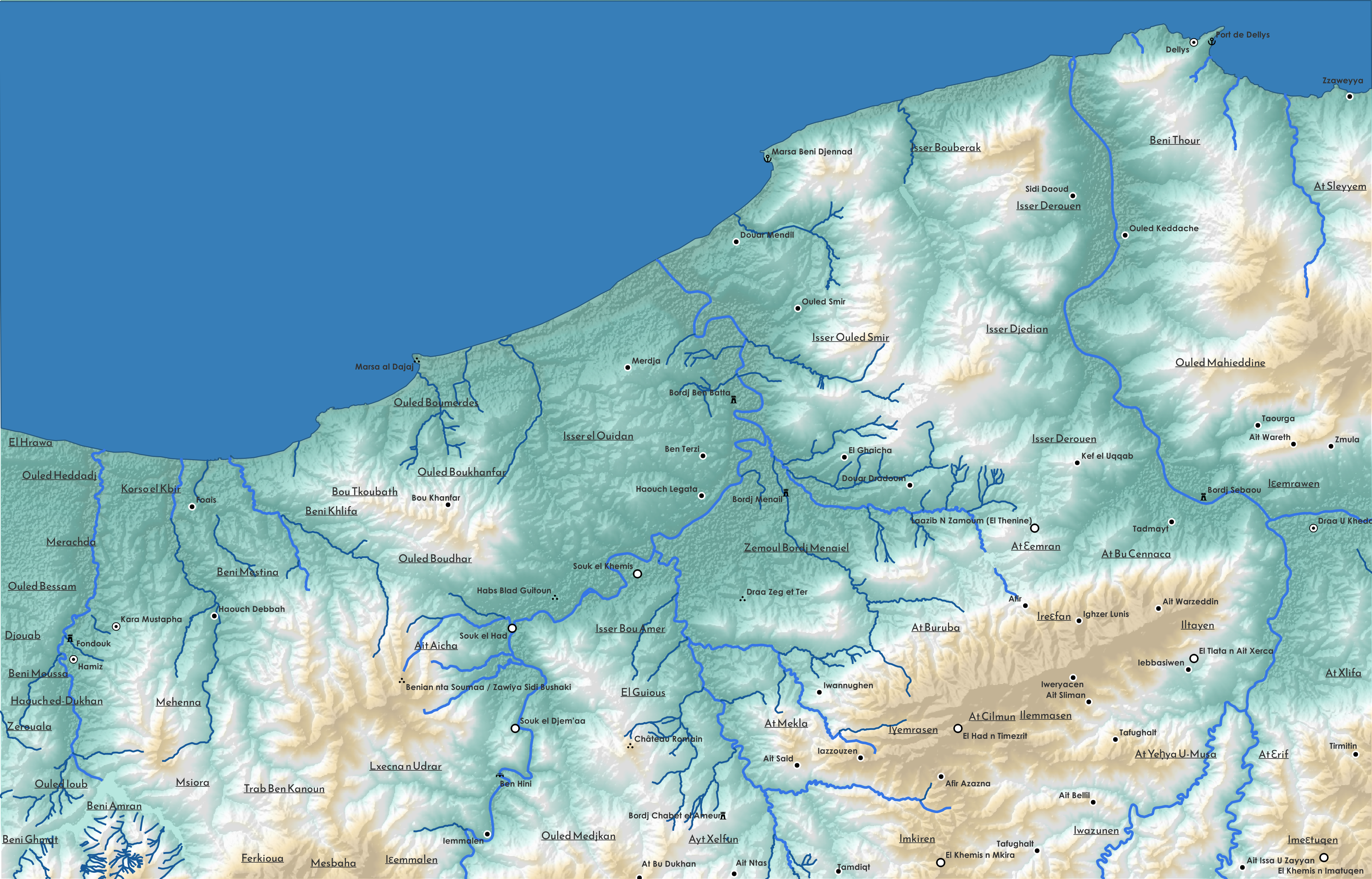
The situation in the Isser plain in 1830, at the start of the French invasion

== Geography ==
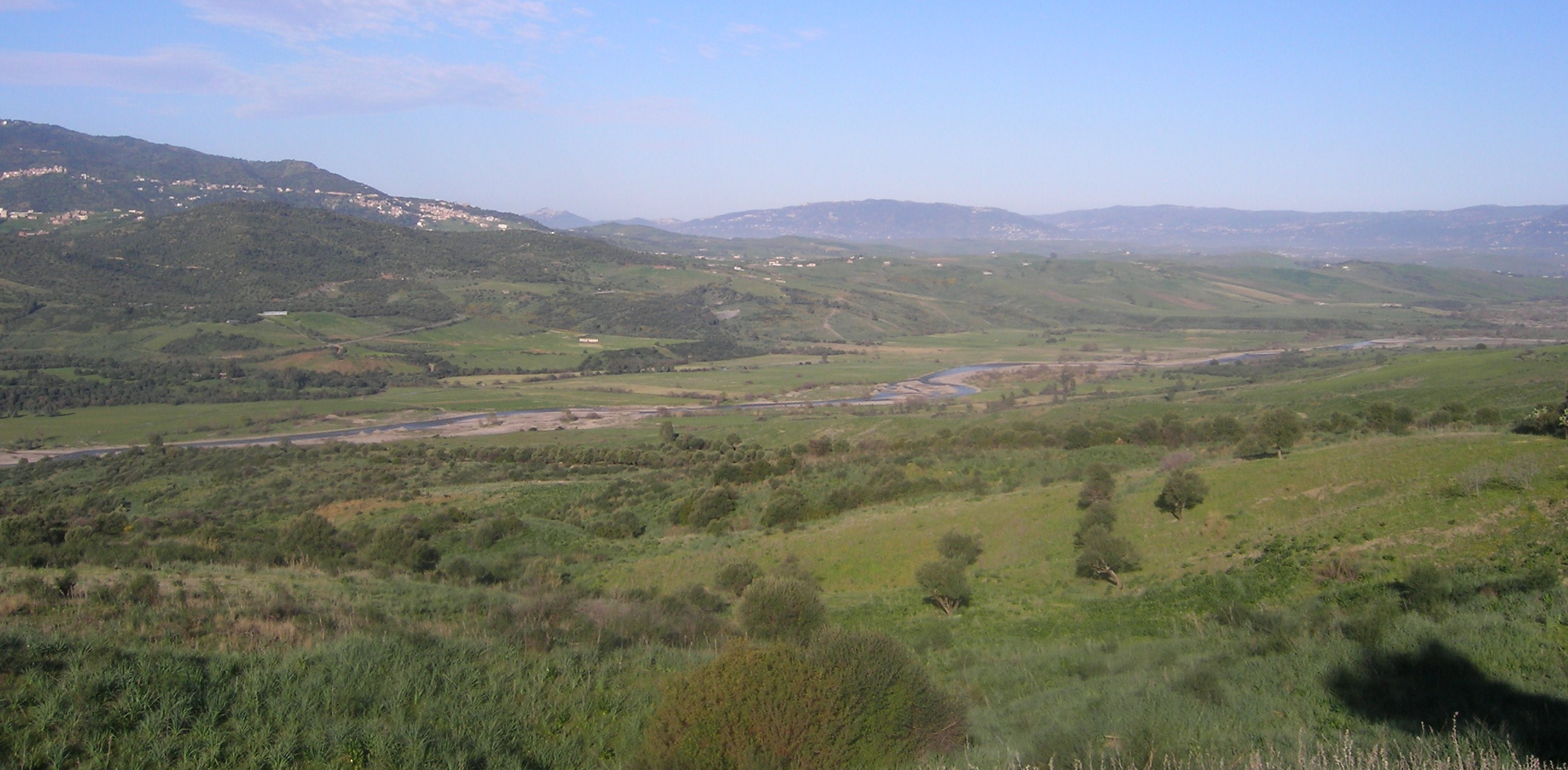
Isser Oued River

The Oued Isser is the receptacle of the waters of the southern slope of the Khachna massif and the Blida Atlas.

In Draâ Tabel in the Beni Ostman, at 420 meters above sea level, it takes the name Oued Isser, which it keeps until its mouth in the Mediterranean Sea. Its sources sprout from a great number of points, almost all on the flanks of the immense plateau of the Beni Slimane, plateau between Médéa and Sour El Ghozlane.

The three main rivers that contribute to the formation of Oued Isser are: The first, on the side of Medea: Wadi Malah, also formed by three other small rivers: Wad Ladrech, whose source is in the Ouled Trif, on the side of Medea; The Wadi El Hammam, which originates in the Ouled Malel, occupies the center; Oued Meleh, which originates in Si Mohamed Ghoglath;

The second river is called Oued El Meleh or Oued Yaggou; Its main source is in Ouled Mouby, in Ain Nar. This river is placed between the preceding and the following; And the third Oued Zegkrouat; The main source near Sour El Ghozlane, in Bouid-Saël, in the Ouled Ferah.

All these rivers receive a certain number of streams, streams, which bear different names, sometimes that of a marabout, sometimes that of the territory; they often supply quite considerable quantities of water, Autumn and winter.

A reservoir dam was built in 1987 on the course of Oued Isser at the level of the commune of Béni Amrane. This dam of Beni Amrane has a storage capacity of 11.85 million m³. The Béni Amrane dam serves as a collection tank for the Keddara Bouzegza dam, with a storage capacity of 142.39 million m³.

== See also ==
- Arabeya Valley
