= Boudouaou Valley =

Valley in Boudouaou, Algeria

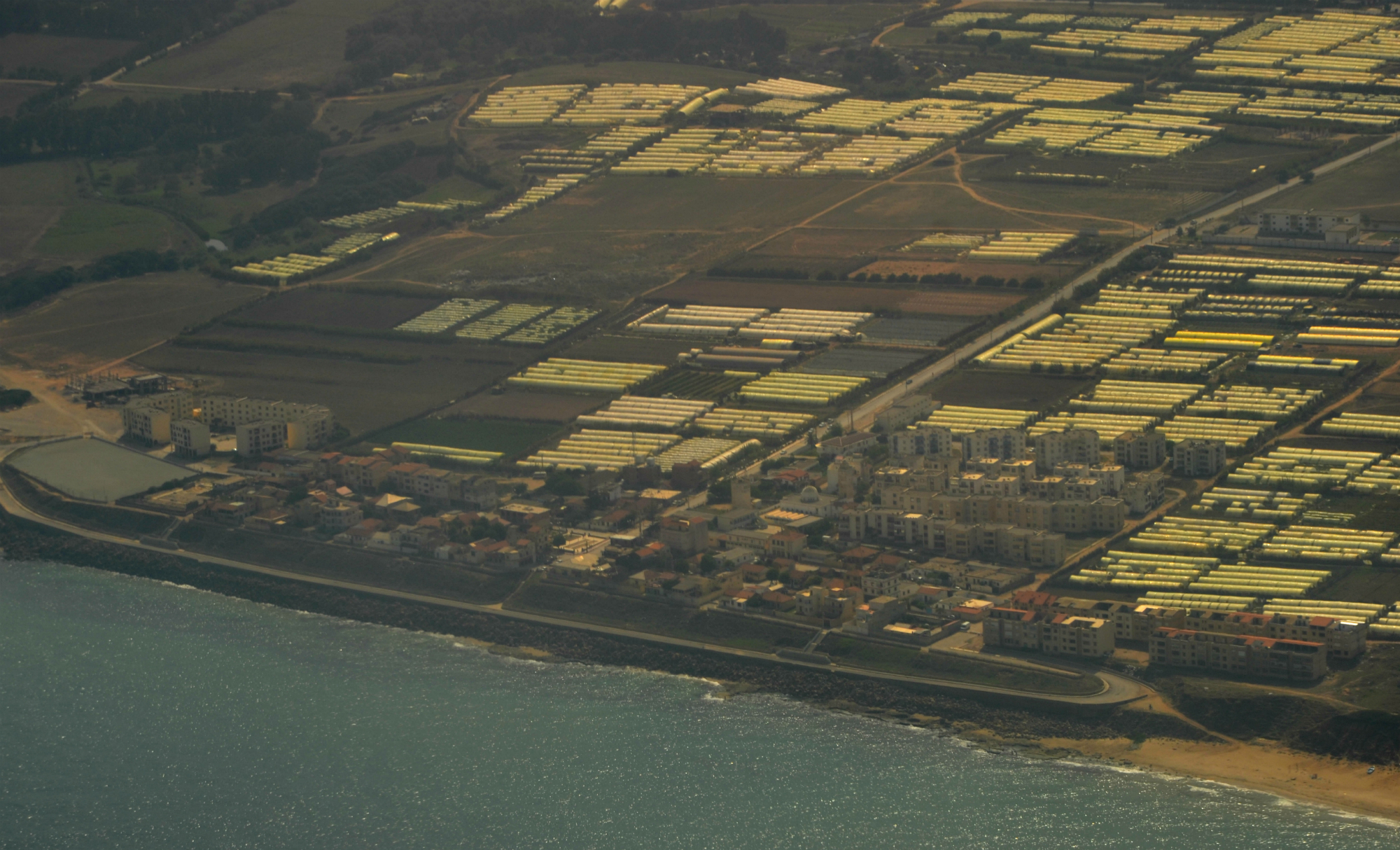

Location
- Country: Boumerdès Province, Algeria

Physical characteristics
- Source: Tell Atlas
  - elevation: 624 m (2,047 ft; 341 fathoms)
- 2nd source: Khachna
  - elevation: 583 m (1,913 ft; 319 fathoms)
- 3rd source: Boumerdès Province
  - elevation: 45 m (148 ft; 25 fathoms)
- Mouth: Boudouaou-El-Bahri

Boudouaou Valley is a river originating in the Khachna Mountains, flowing northward through the city of Boudouaou in Algeria. Along its journey, the valley traverses Boumerdès Province before emptying into the Mediterranean Sea.

== Watercourse ==
Boudouaou Valley, known for its riverbed largely free from schist and earthy deposits, shares this unique feature with nearby rivers such as Arabiyah, Mghaldan, Boumerdès, and Isser. This characteristic allows for the extraction of sand and gravel, which are essential materials in producing mortar and concrete.

Acting as a natural corridor, the valley ranges in width from 5 to 600 meters and gradually descends from its meeting point with the Bouzegza Keddara in the municipality of Kadara, at the base of Mount Bouzegza in the south, until it reaches the Mediterranean Sea east of Boumerdès City.

The valley’s moderate slope was advantageous for constructing the Kadara Dam in 1987. During the rainy season, the increased water flow necessitated the creation of passageways and bridges to facilitate movement for residents of surrounding villages and neighborhoods situated along both banks.

== The Course ==
The "Boudouaou Valley" runs through one coastal Algerian province in the Khachna Mountains.

Municipalities in Boumerdès on the Wadiboudouaou Trail
Number	Boumerdès Province
01	Bouzegza Keddara
02	El Kharrouba
03	Boudouaou
04	Boudouaou-El-Bahri

== Valleys ==
The Boudouaou Valley intersects with several other valleys in Boumerdès Province.

Valleys along the Wadi Boudouaou trail
Number	Boumerdès Province
01	Bouzegza Keddara
02	Hidd Valley
03	Wadi Saharweh
04	Wadi Ben Marzouga

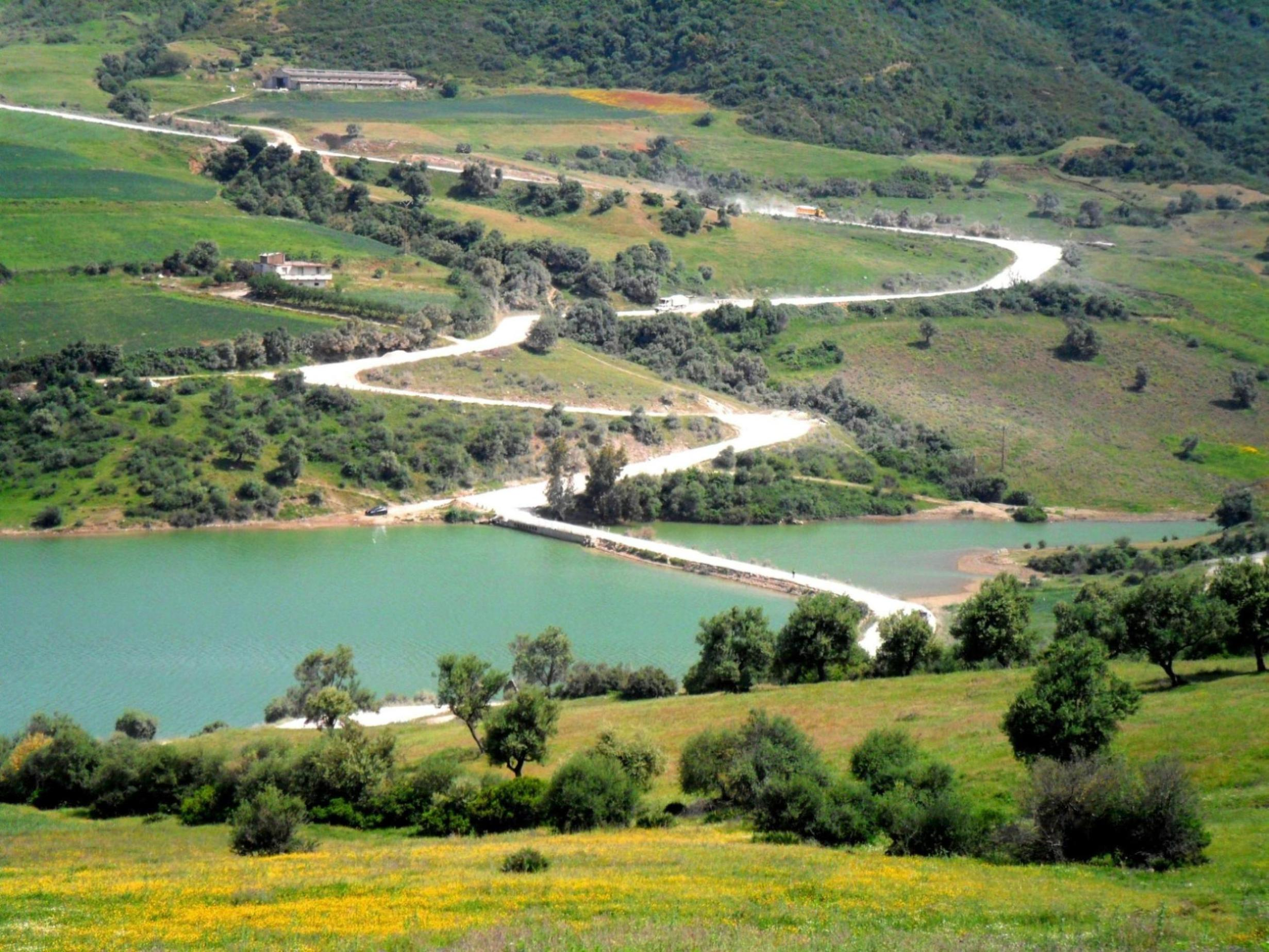
Keddara Dam

== Dams ==
The Boudouaou Valley flows through several dams in Boumerdès Province along its course.

The Dams in the Course of 'Wadi Boudouaou
Boumerdès Province	Coordinates
Keddara Dam	36.645057°N 3.4237084°E

== National roads ==
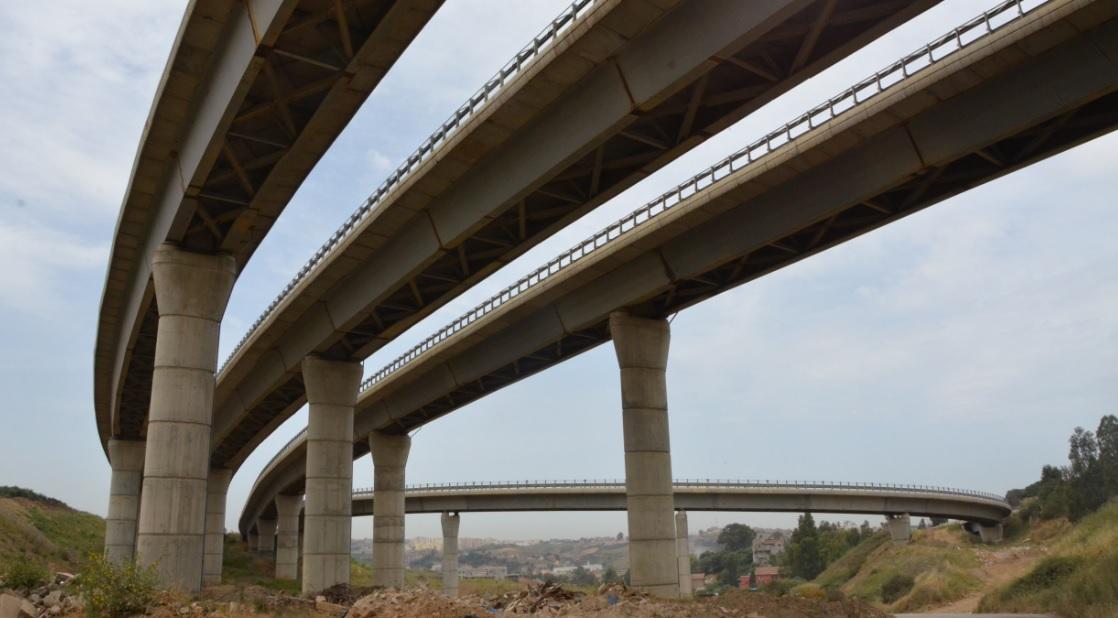
Berhamoun Bridge in Boudouaou

The Boudouaou Valley intersects with several national roads as it traverses Boumerdès Province in the Khachna Mountains.

National roads
Number	Boumerdès Province	Coordinates
1	National Road 5	31°43′15.83″N 3°24′57.19″E
2	National Road 24	36°45′14.27″N 3°24′56.26″E
3	National Road 29	36°39′2.87″N 3°25′0.41″E

== Gallery ==
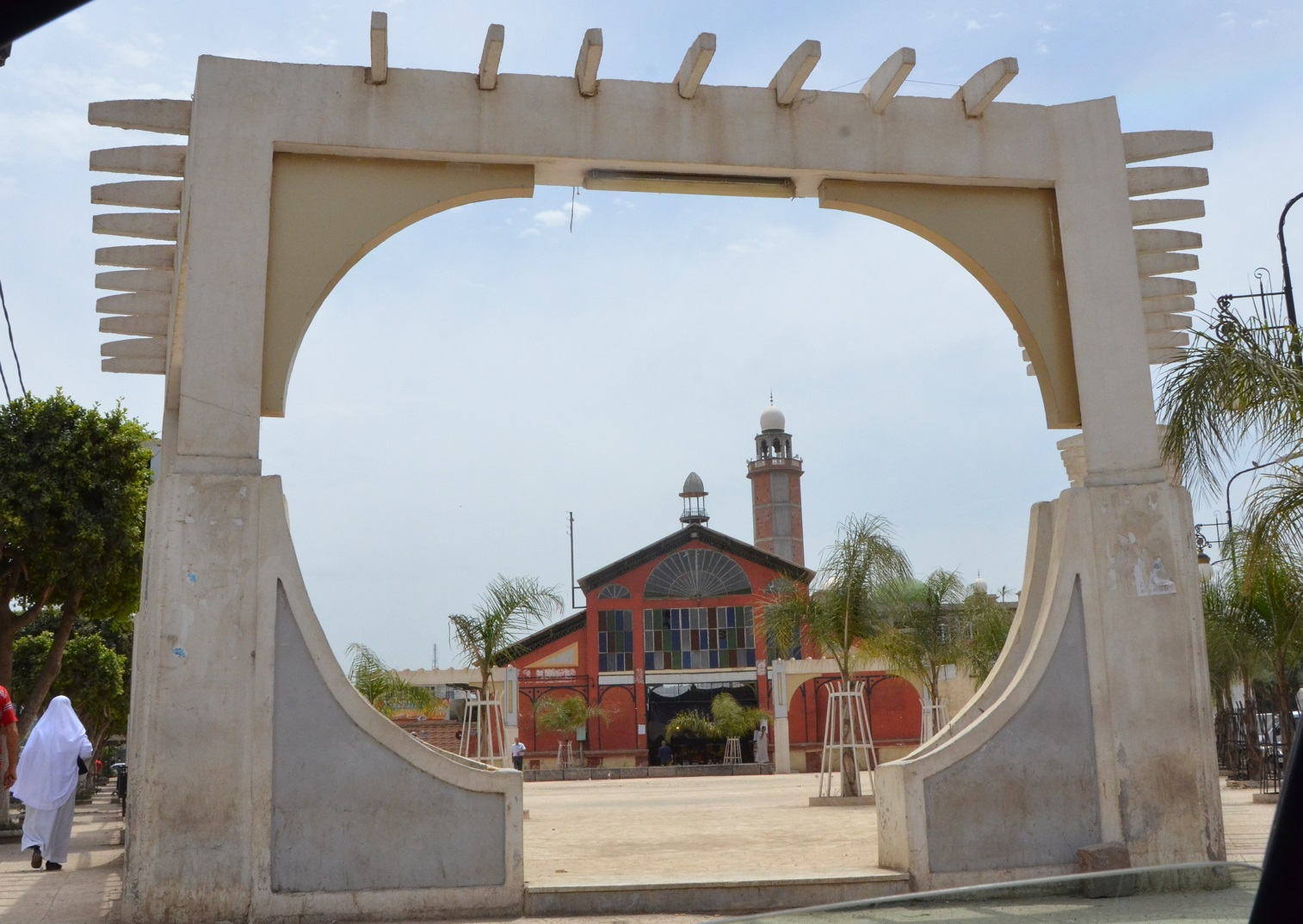
Boudouaou city center.

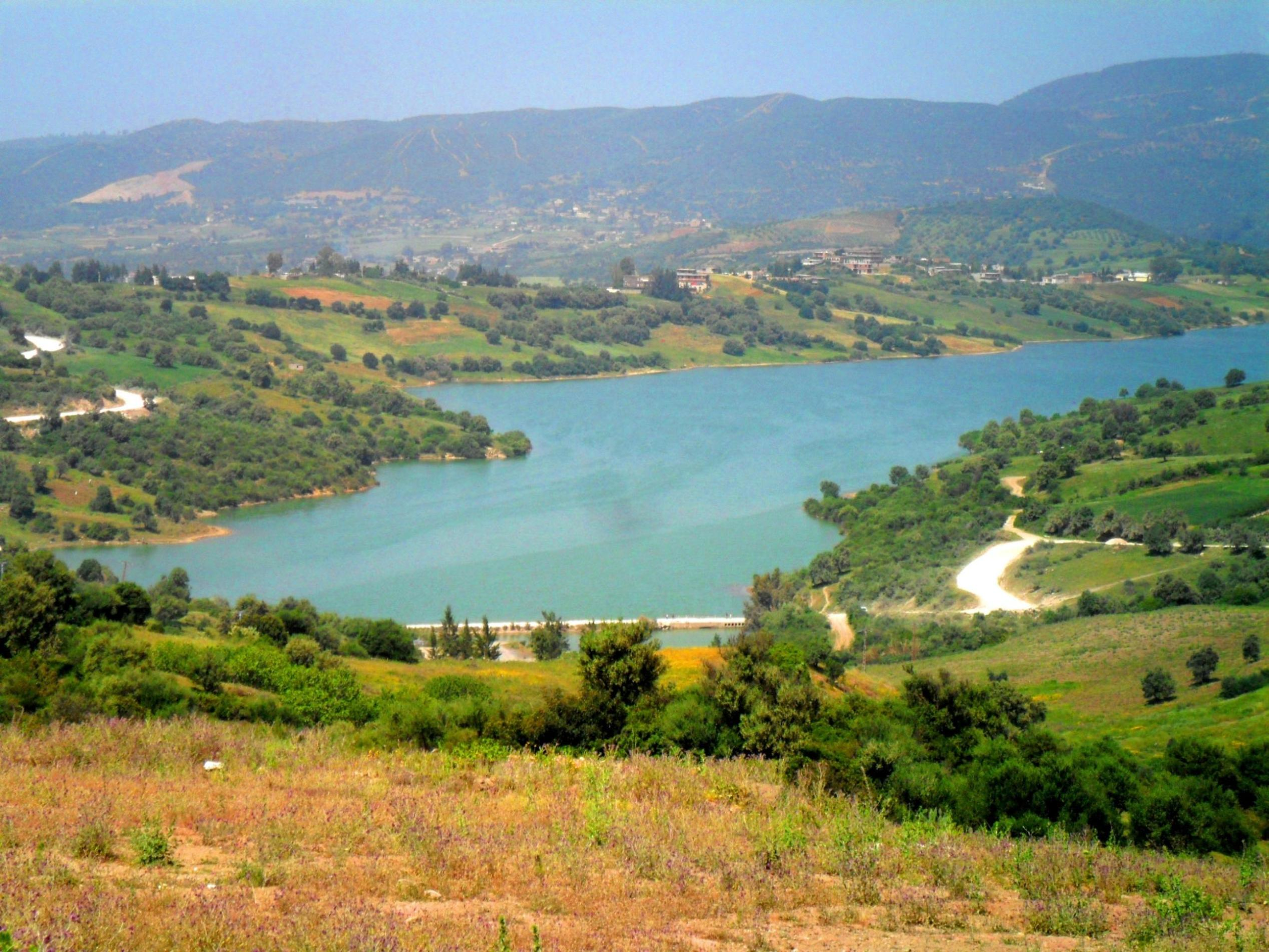
Keddara Dam

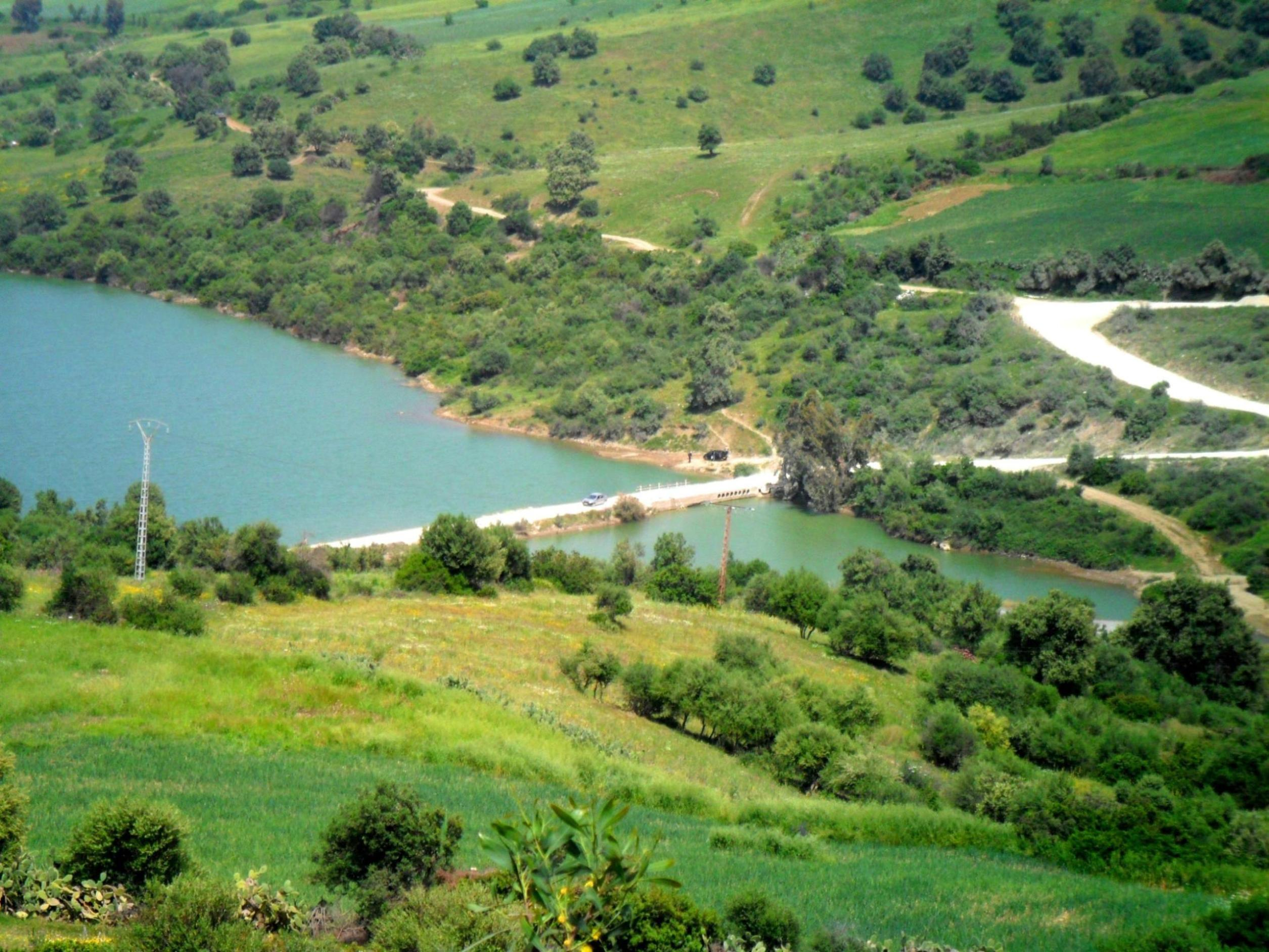
Keddara Dam

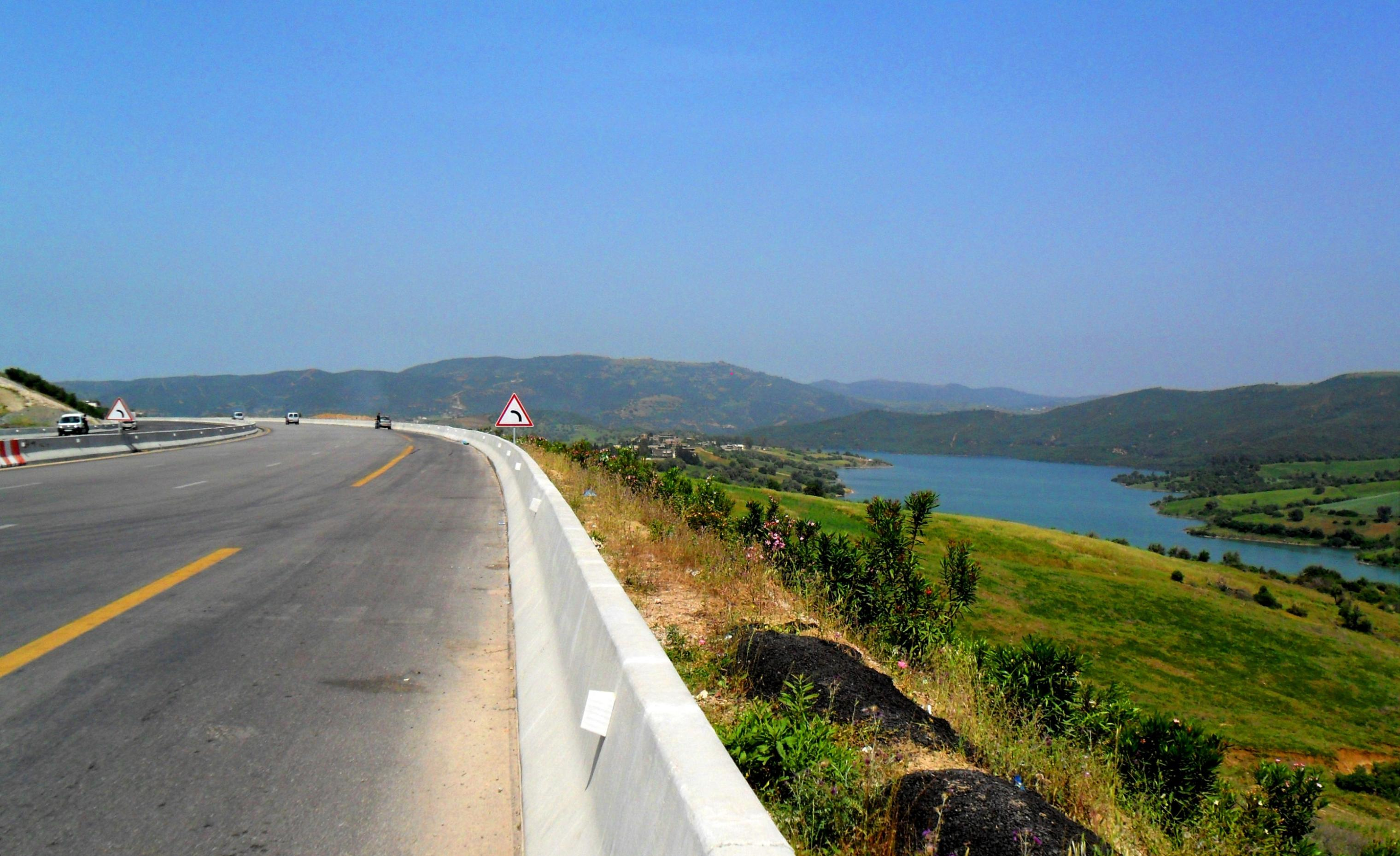
Keddara Dam

== See also ==
- List of rivers of Algeria
- Ministry of Water Resources and Environment
- Discharge regime
- Tell Atlas
- Khachna
- Tourism in Algeria
- Boumerdès Valley
