= Boudouaou (disambiguation) =

Boudouaou is a town and commune in Algeria.

It may also refer to:

== Places ==
- Boudouaou-El-Bahri, a commune in Algeria.
- Boudouaou District, a district in Algeria.

== History ==
- First Battle of Boudouaou (1837), a battle during the French conquest of Algeria.
- Second Battle of Boudouaou (1871), a battle during the Mokrani Revolt of Algeria.
- 2006 Boudouaou bombing, a terrorist attack in Algeria.
- 2011 Boudouaou rail accident, a rail accident in Algeria.
