= Bouzegza Mountain =

Mountain in Boumerdès, Alegria

Bouzegza Keddara
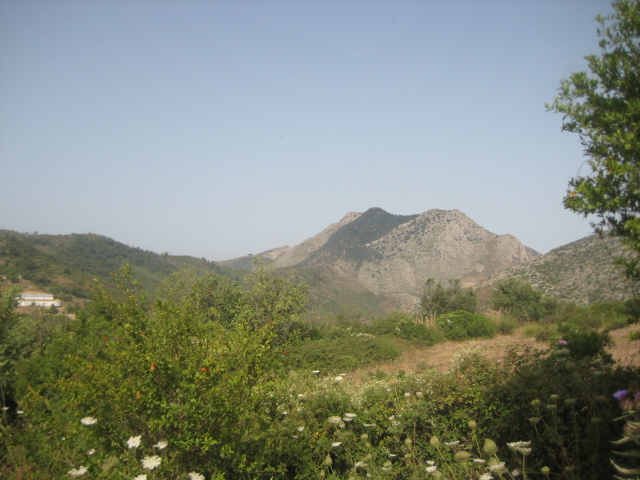

Highest point
- Elevation: 1,033 m (3,389 ft)
- Prominence: 1,033 m (3,389 ft)
- Listing: Khachna
- Coordinates: 36°36′24″N 3°27′02″E

Geography
- Location within Algeria
- Location: Keddara Municipality - Boudouaou District - Boumerdès Province
- Parent range: Al Kheshna Mountains - Atlas Hill

Geology
- Rock age: Quaternary

Bouzegza Mountain or Blue Mountain is a mountain peak in the Kheshna mountain range in the Atlas hill in Algeria, located in the municipality of Keddara in the district of Boudouaou in the Boumerdès governorate in Algeria.

== Description ==
Bouzegza Mountain is the highest mountain peak in Boumerdès, with an elevation of 1,033 m (3,389 ft), overlooking the eastern Algerian Gulf and the Mitidja plain, and facing the Titteri Mountains.

It is offset by the Bouzirea mountain in the west of the Algerian Gulf where the Casbah of Algiers was established on its slope by Buluggin ibn Ziri.

The top of this mountain is accessible via three national roads: National Road No. 5, National Road No. 29, and the East-West Highway.

== History ==
Bouzegza Mountain area witnessed the events of the Battle of Bouzegza, which took place during the Algerian War.

On August 4, 8, and 12, of 1957, Lieutenant Ali Khoja, at the head of a battalion of the Algerian National Liberation Army, confronted the French armed forces, which were personally commanded by Jacques Massu and three other generals.

Despite their large numbers and equipment, the French suffered a heavy defeat, losing about 600 soldiers in this historic battle, while the soldiers of the 4th province counted only a handful of wounded in their ranks.

== Geology ==
The formation of Bouzegza mountain dates back to the Quaternary of the Cenozoic on the geologic time scale.

The surrounding terrain is characterized by gray marble that is connected by paths of reddish siderite and iron ore.

The composition of this terrain is characterized by the presence of crystalline schist and mica schist.

== Quarries ==
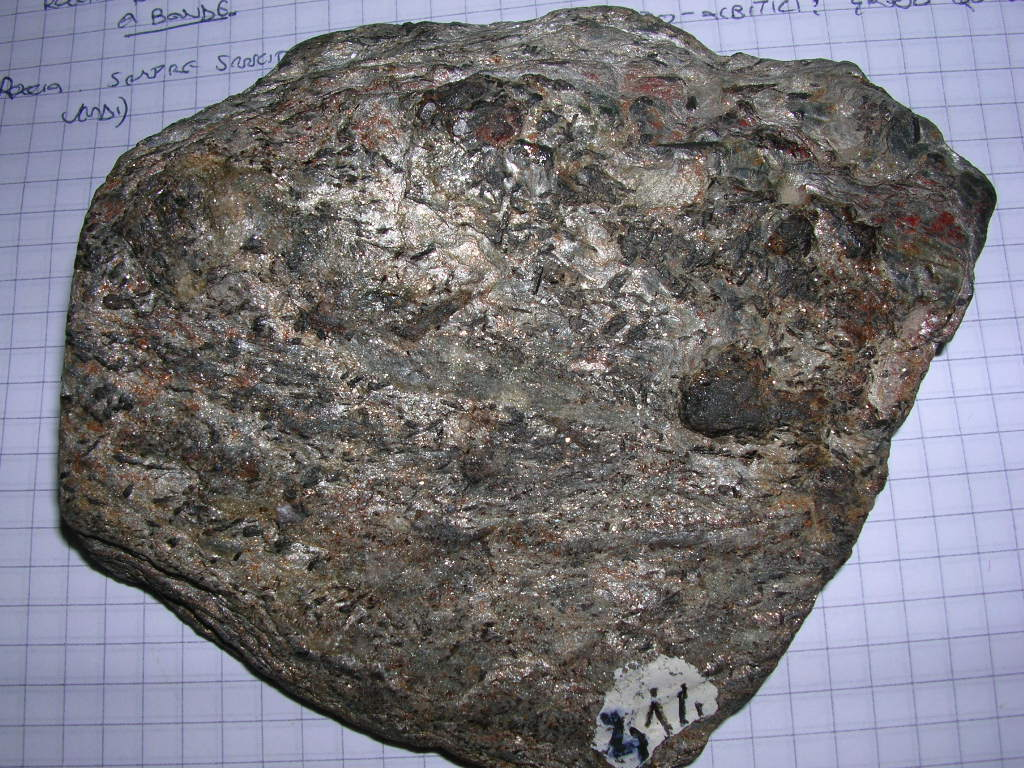
Mica schist

Around the foot of Bouzegza mountain, there are several quarries specializing in the extraction of:

- Rocks.
- Marble.
- Sand.
- Gravel.
- Clay for ceramics.
- Non-metallic ores.

== Tourism ==
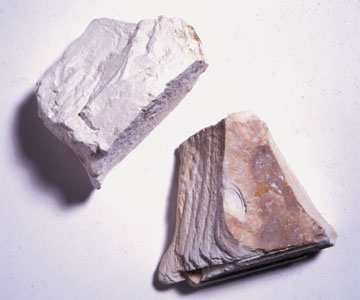
Kaolinite

The Kaf Boukerdane area near Bouzegza mountain is a popular tourist attraction for residents of Algiers, Boumerdès and other states.

Many attractions are of interest to visitors. These include:

- Shadi's room
- Auntie Hasna's room

== Valleys ==
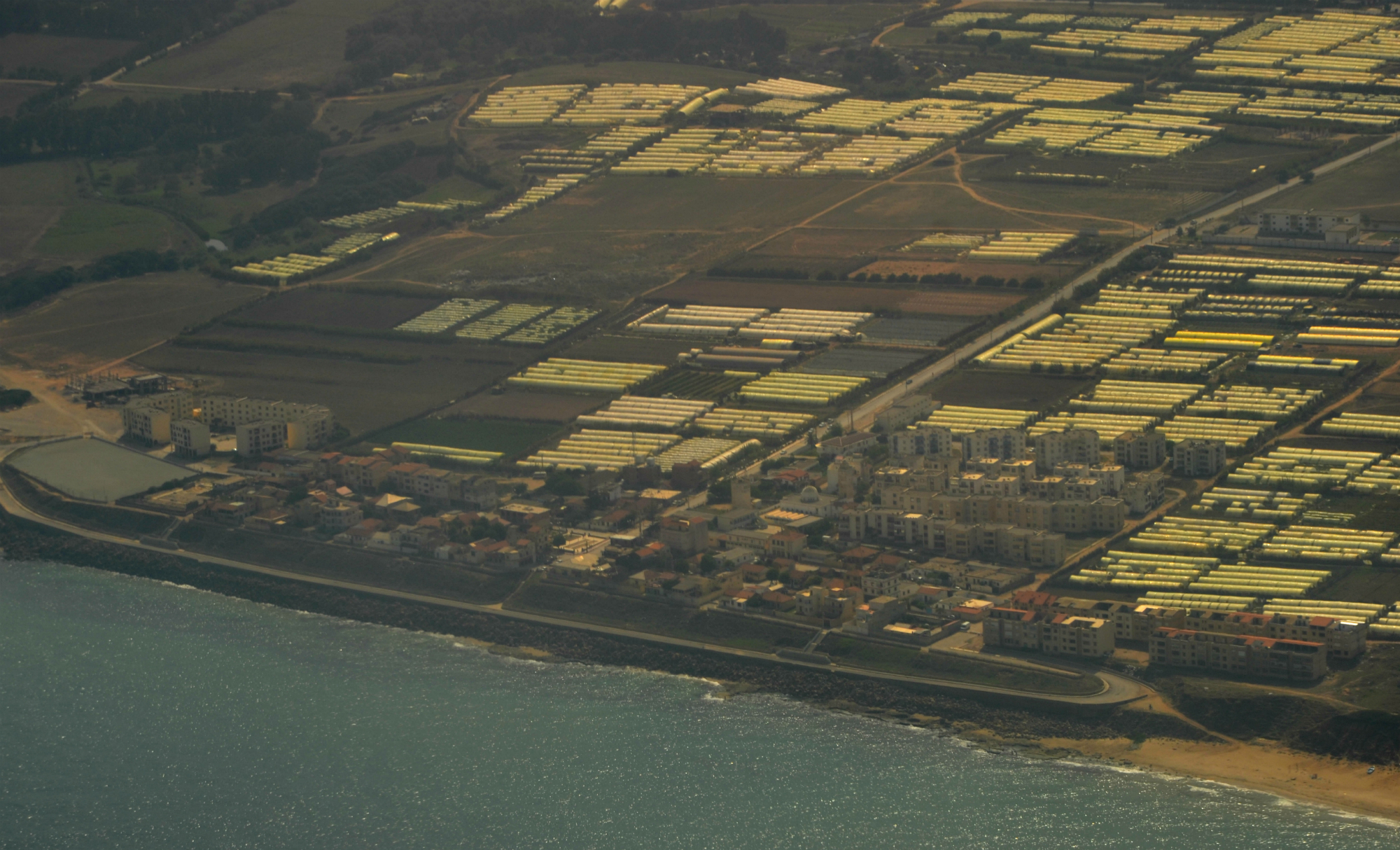
Boudouaou valley estuary

Many valleys originates and surrounds Bouzegza mountain including:

- Bouzegza Valley
- Boudouaou Valley
- Qorsu Valley
- Farah Valley

== Dams and lakes ==
- Keddara Dam
- Shaqour Guelta

== Ecological diversity ==
=== Trees ===
Many species of trees surround Bouzegza mountain and its forests.

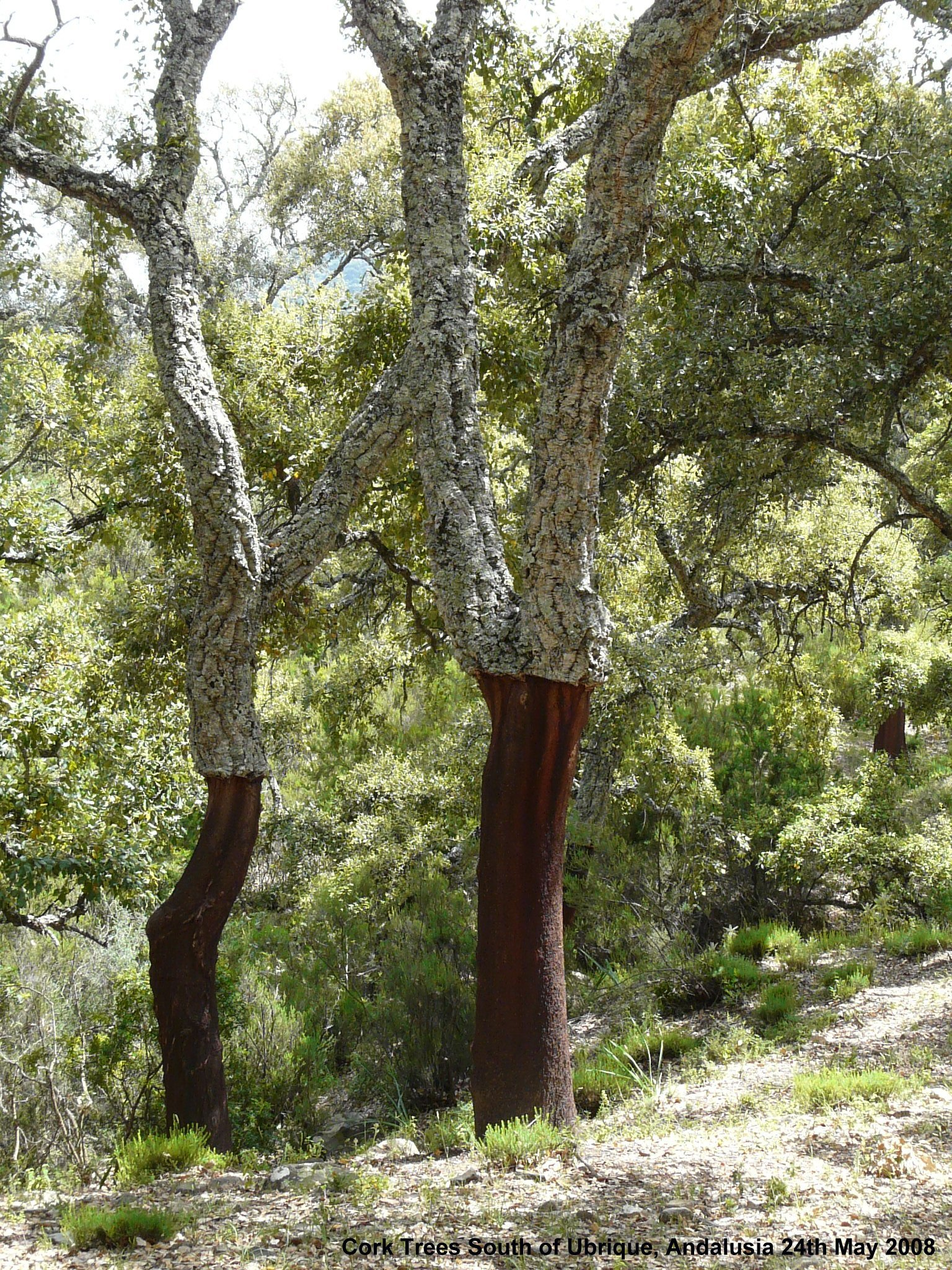
Quercus suber

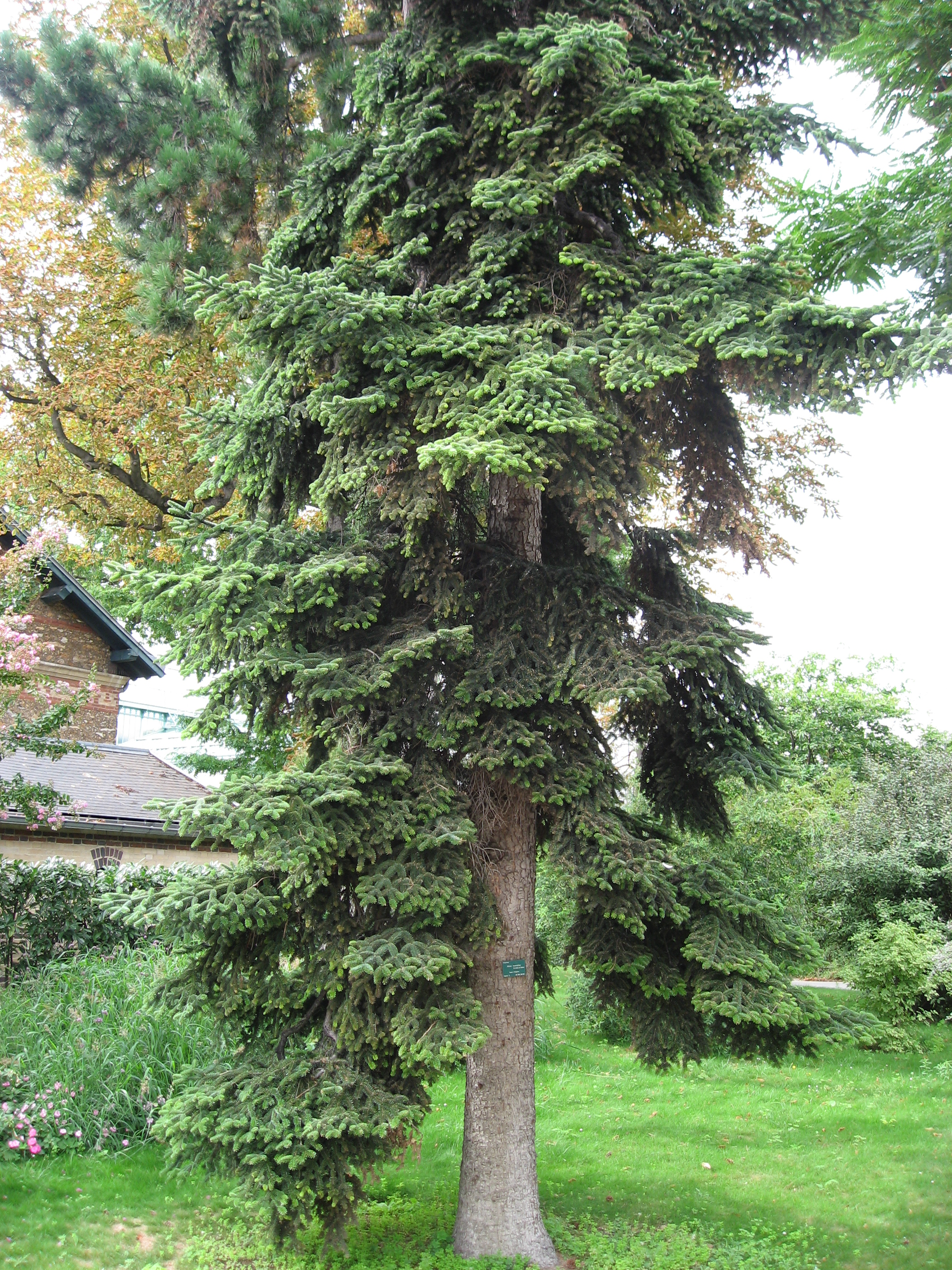
Abies numidica

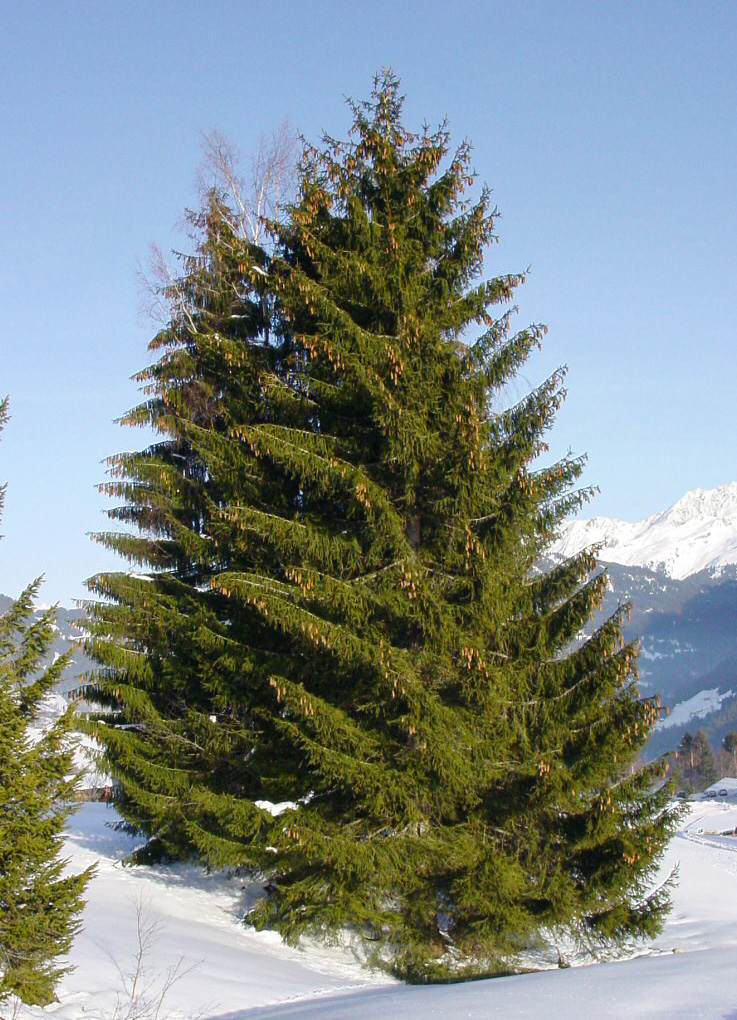
Picea abies

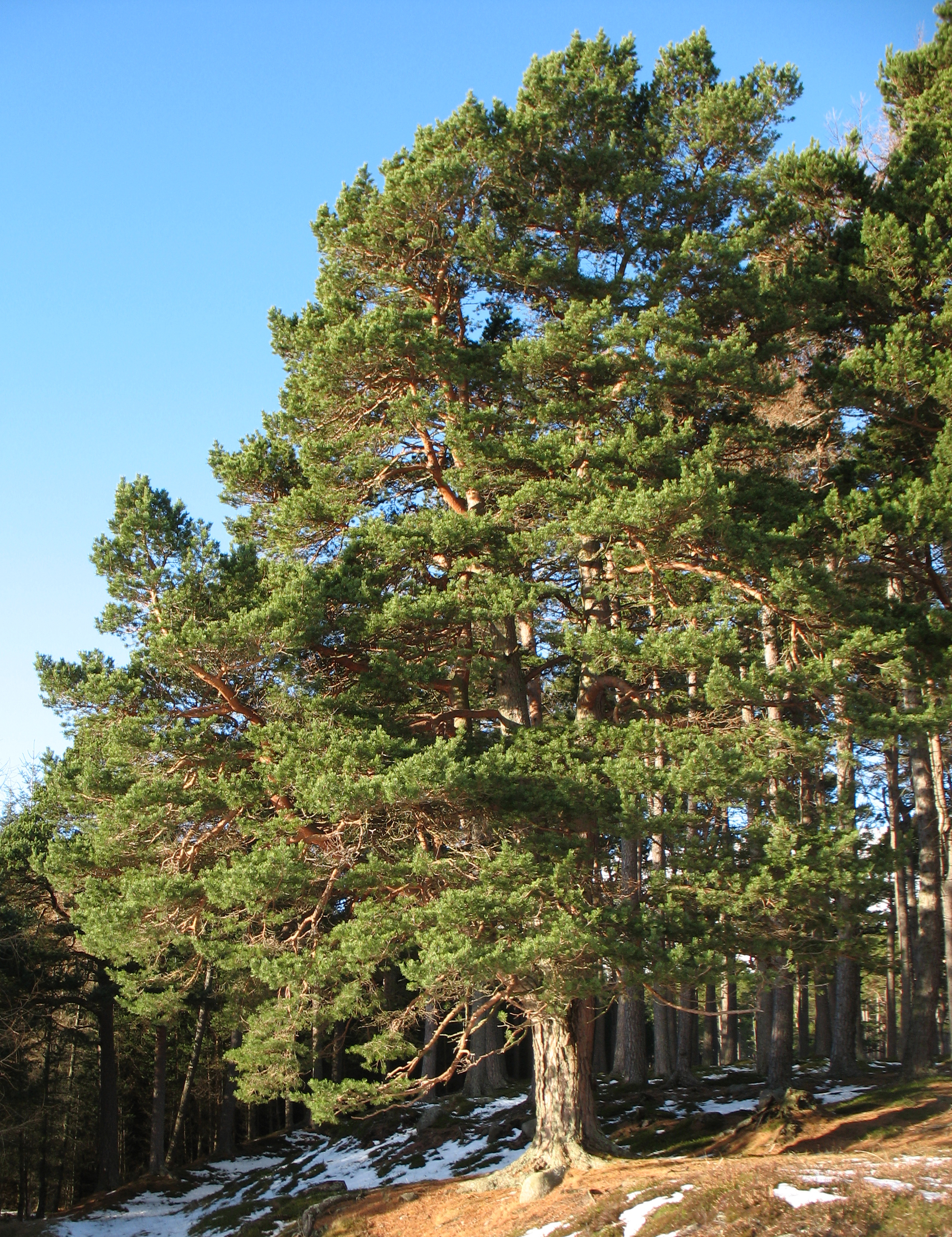
Pinus sylvestris

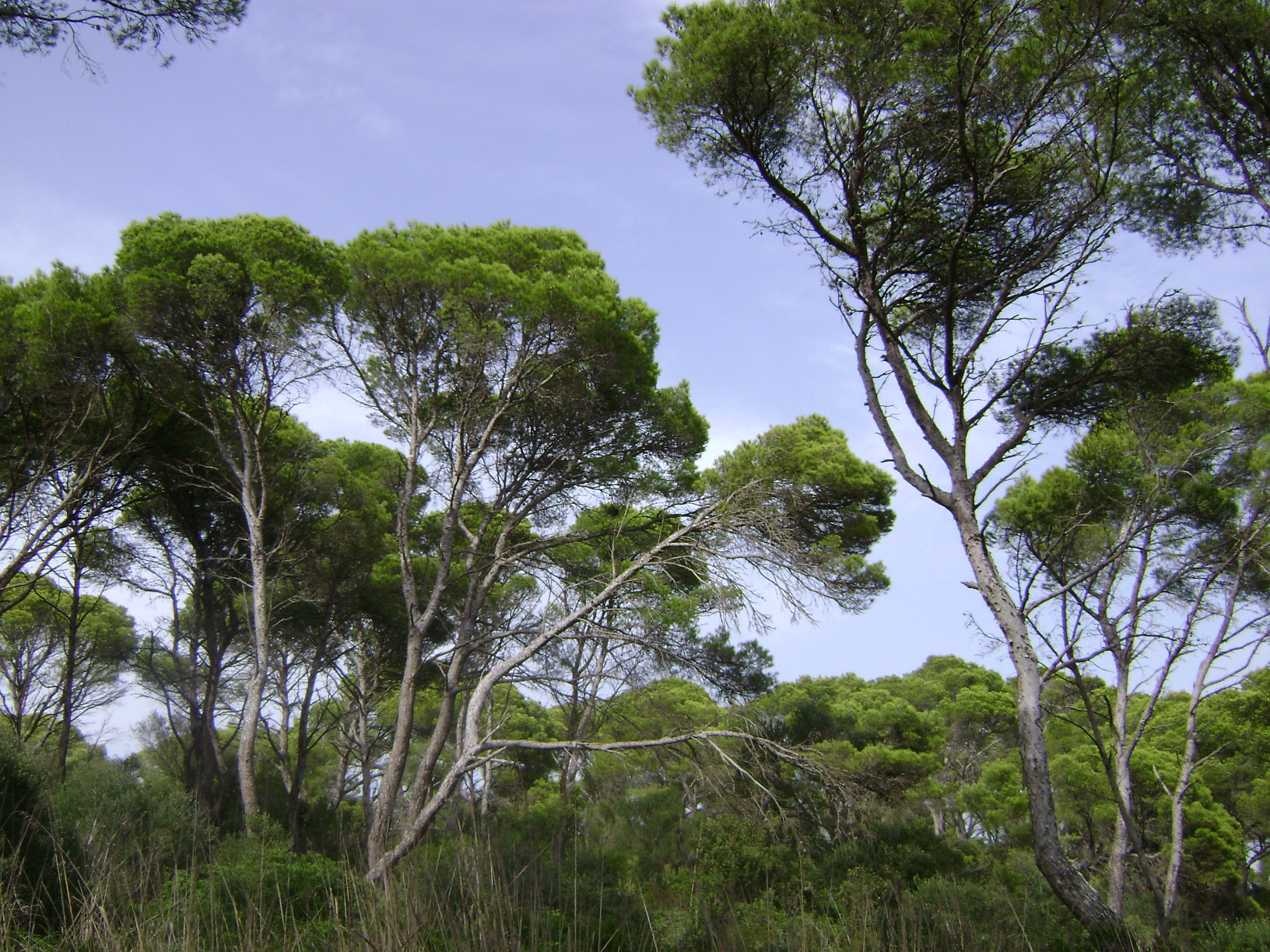
Pinus halepensis

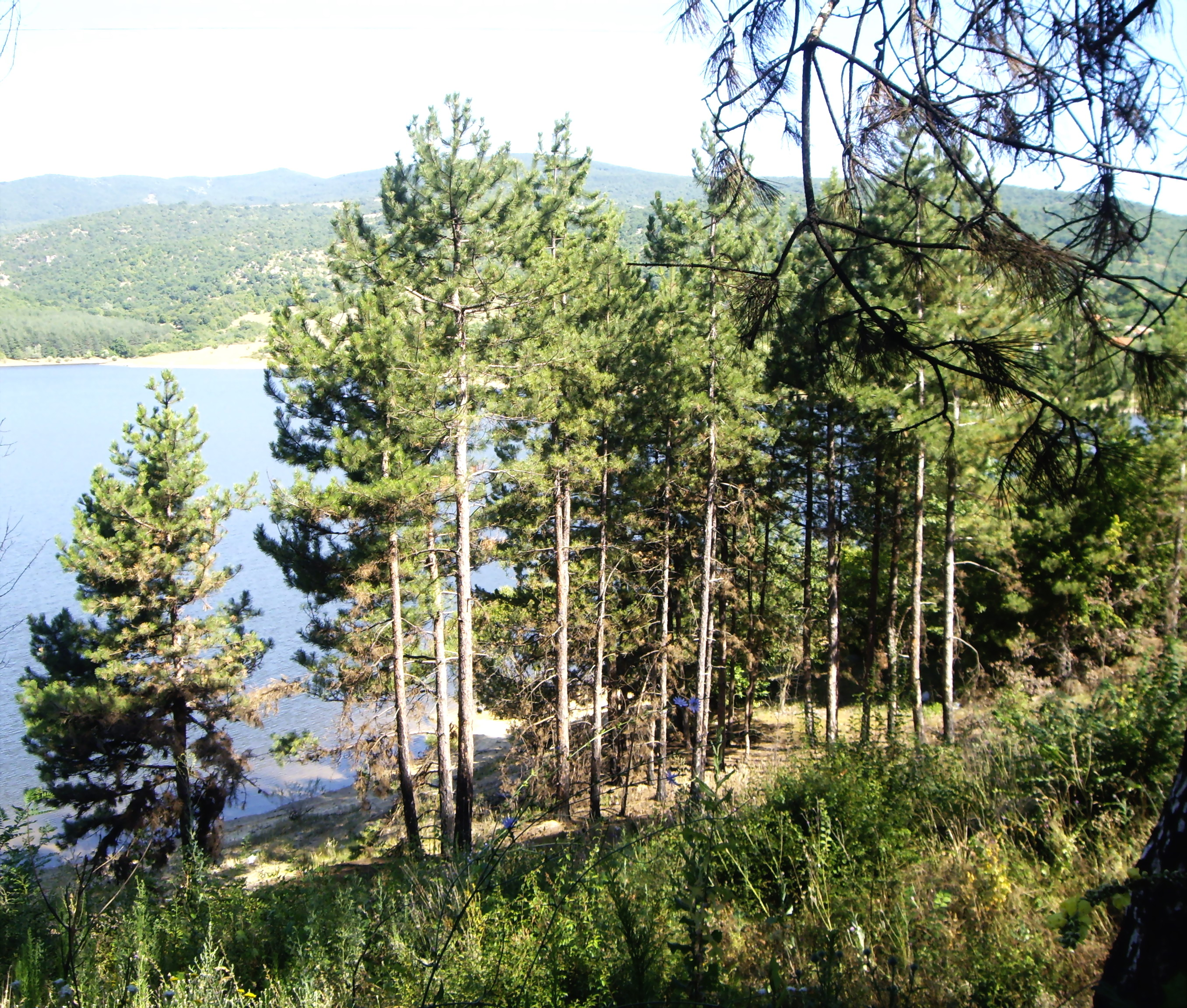
Pinus nigra

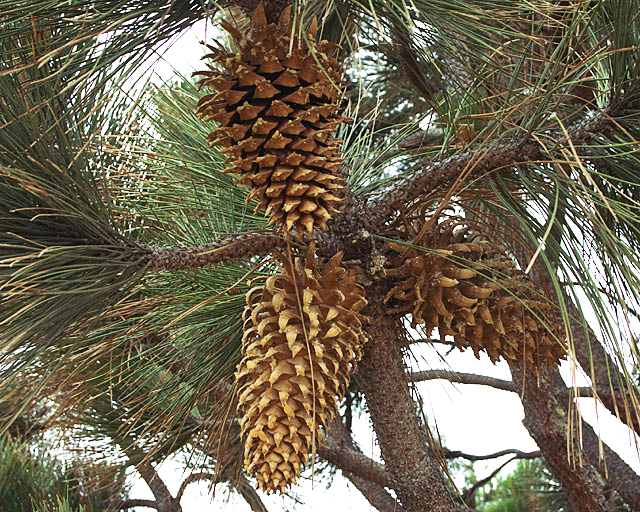
Coulter pine

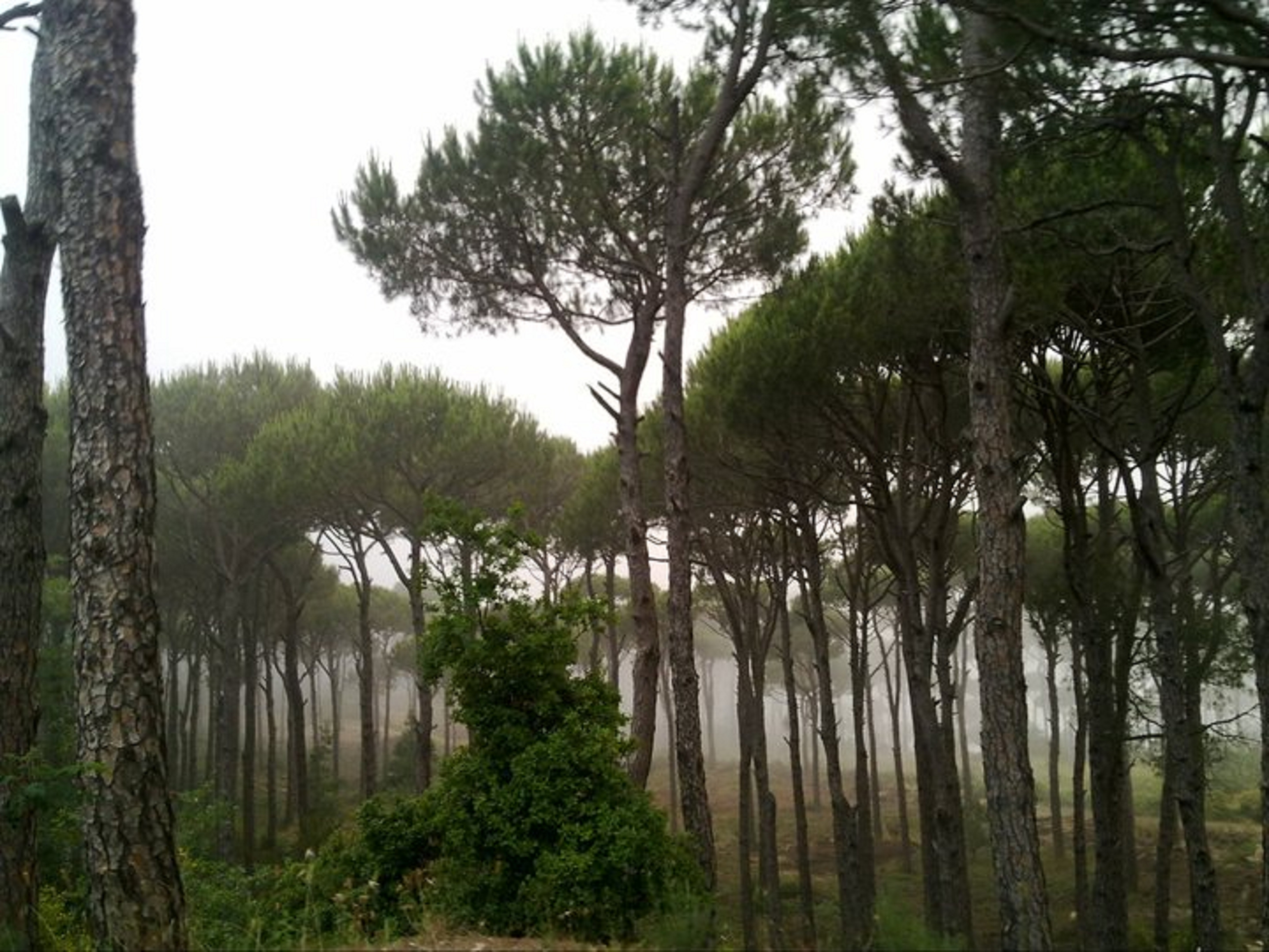
Stone pine

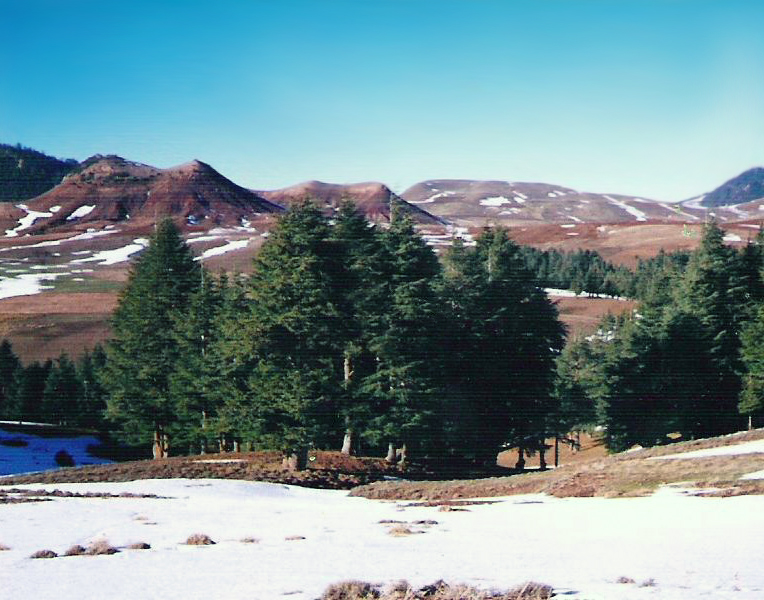
Cedrus atlantica

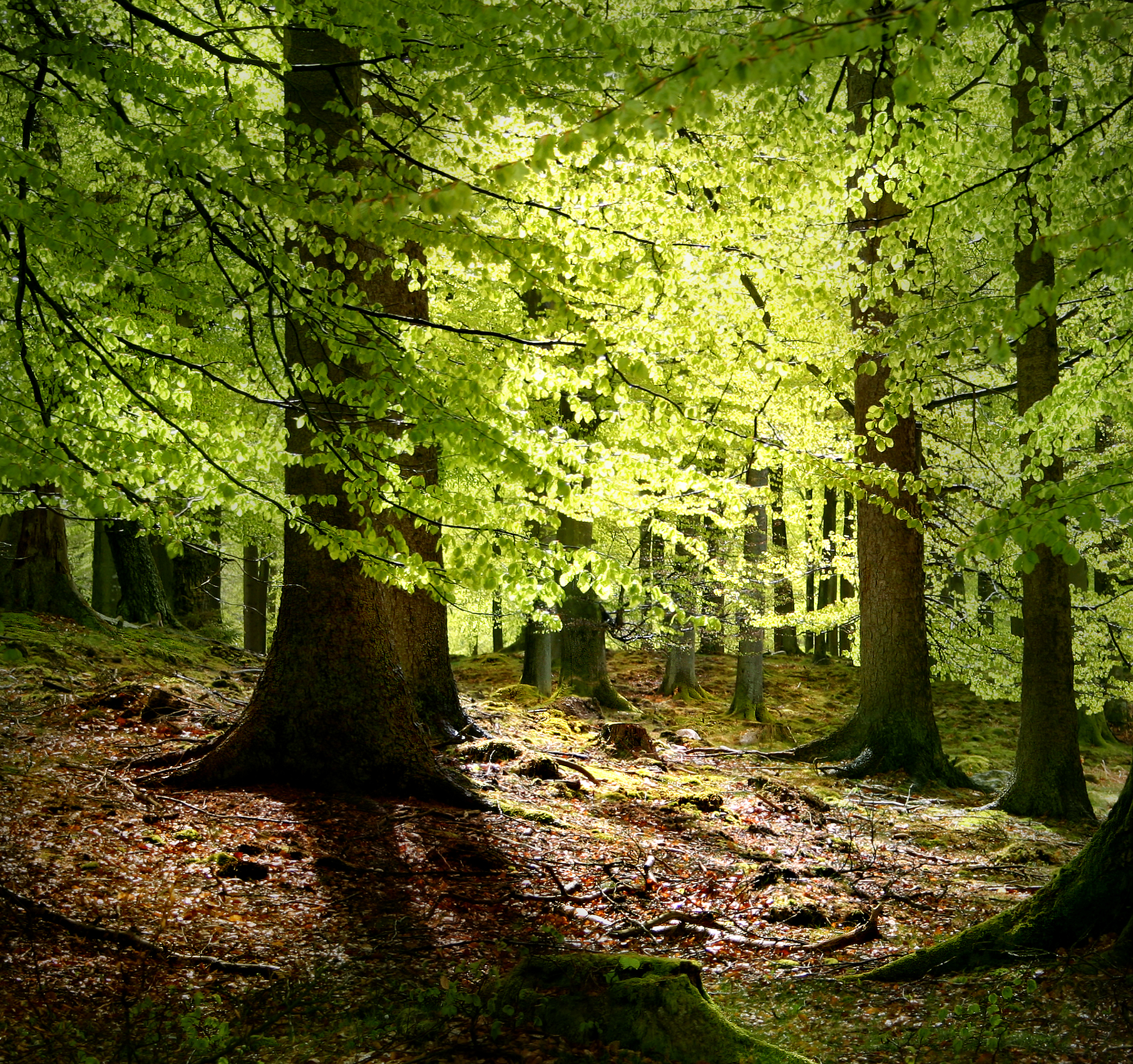
Fagus sylvatica

=== Barbary macaque ===
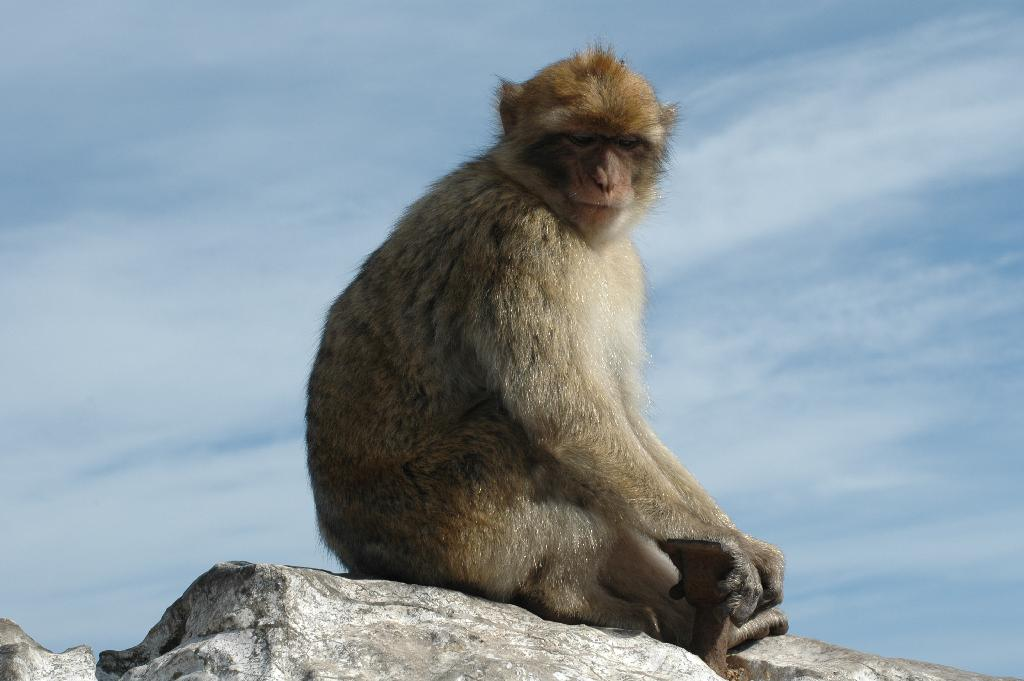
Barbary Macaque

The Barbary macaque is found near Bouzegza mountain, and sometimes ventures out into roads and populated areas to ask for food.

The Algerian government has taken several measures to protect this endangered animal. For example, signs are posted in places where the animals are found to prevent people from feeding the monkeys, as some of the foods people give the monkeys can lead to their death. Also preventing them from owning them for breeding purposes.

The Algerian government has also initiated the creation of several nature reserves where large numbers of the species are found, such as the Taza National Park and the Goraya National Park overlooking the Bay of Bejaia, as well as the Djurdjura National Park.

=== Animals ===
Many species of mammals live in the Kheshna mountains within the forests of the Bouzegza forest and as well other forests.

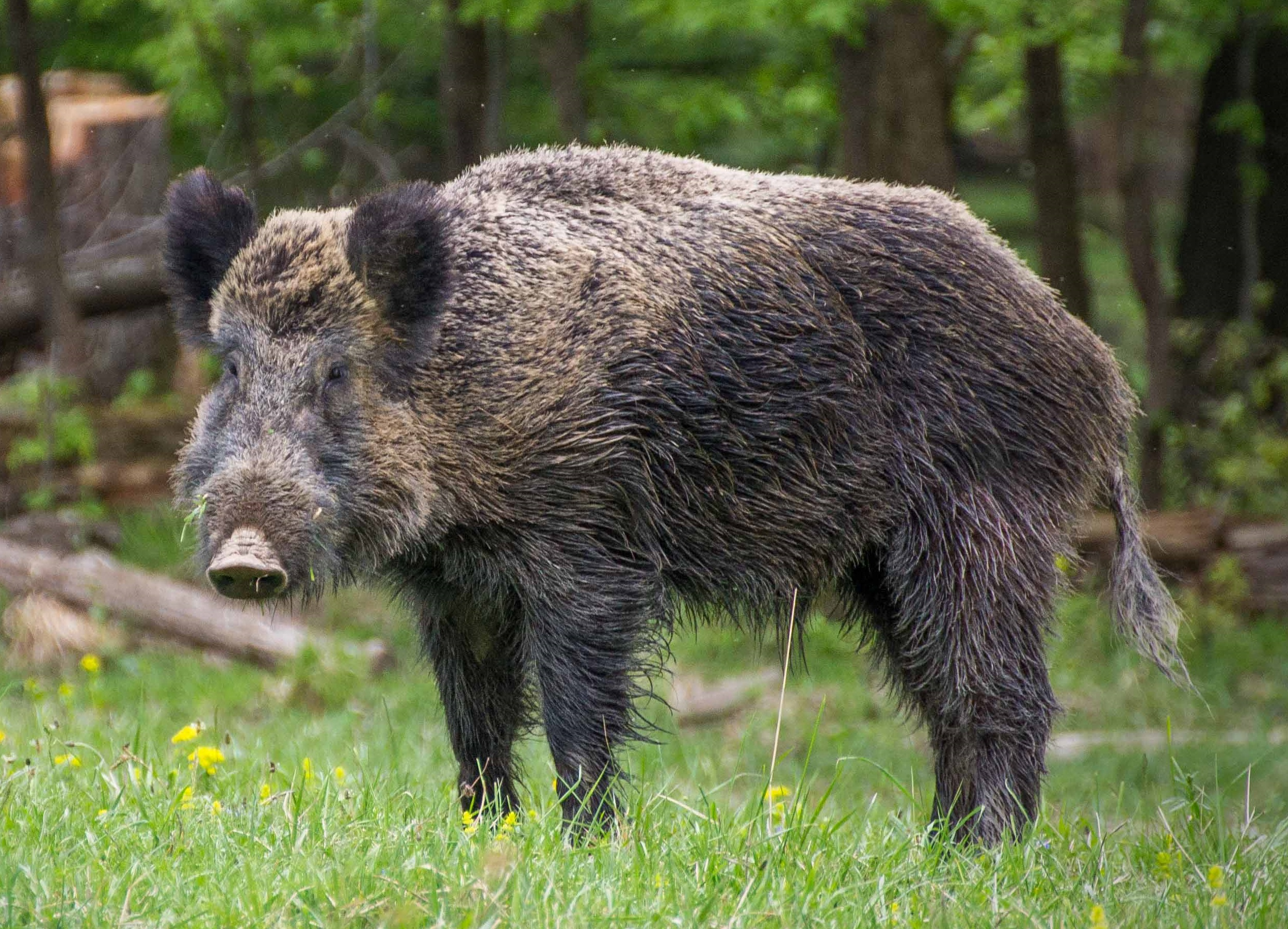
Wild boar

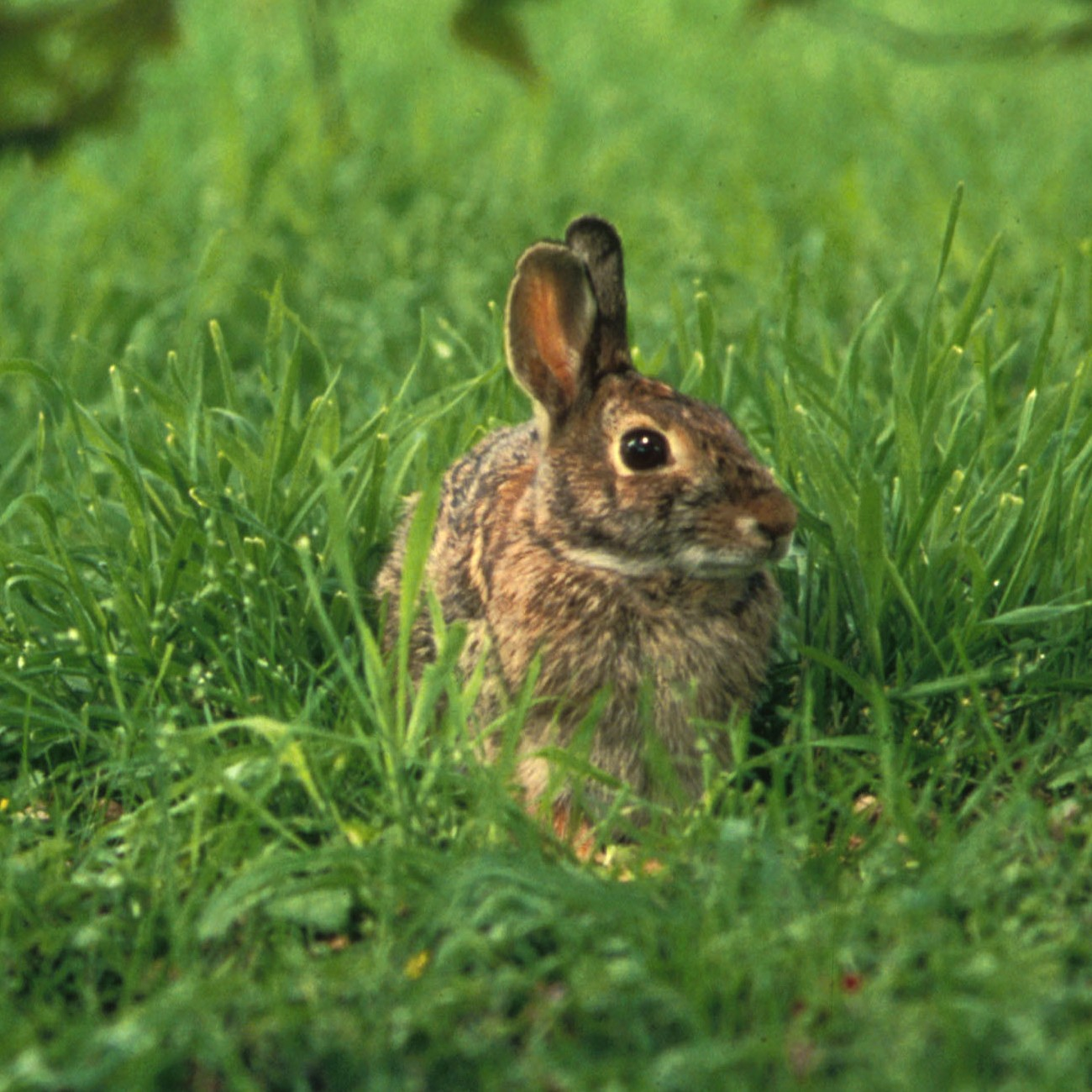
Rabbit

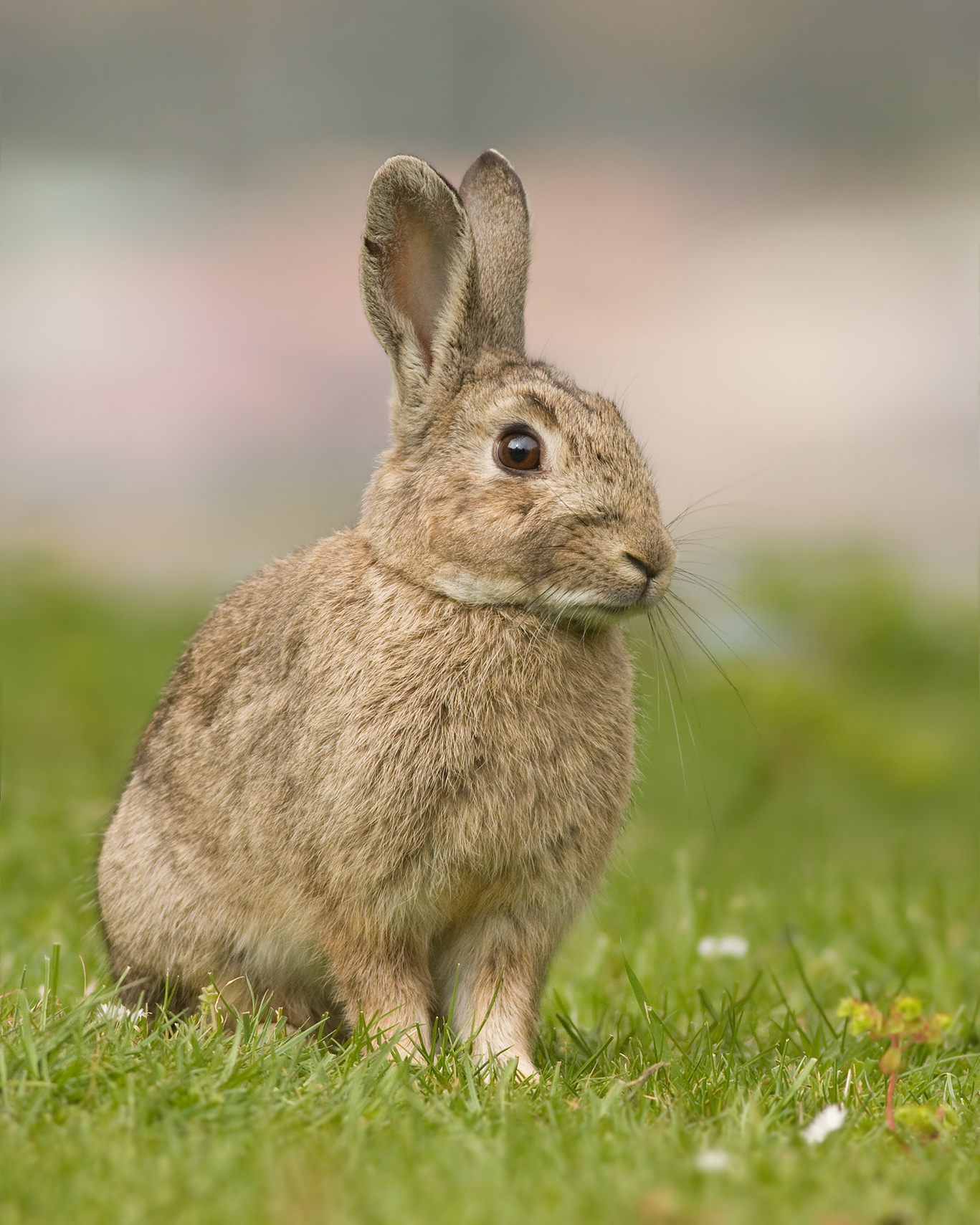
European rabbit

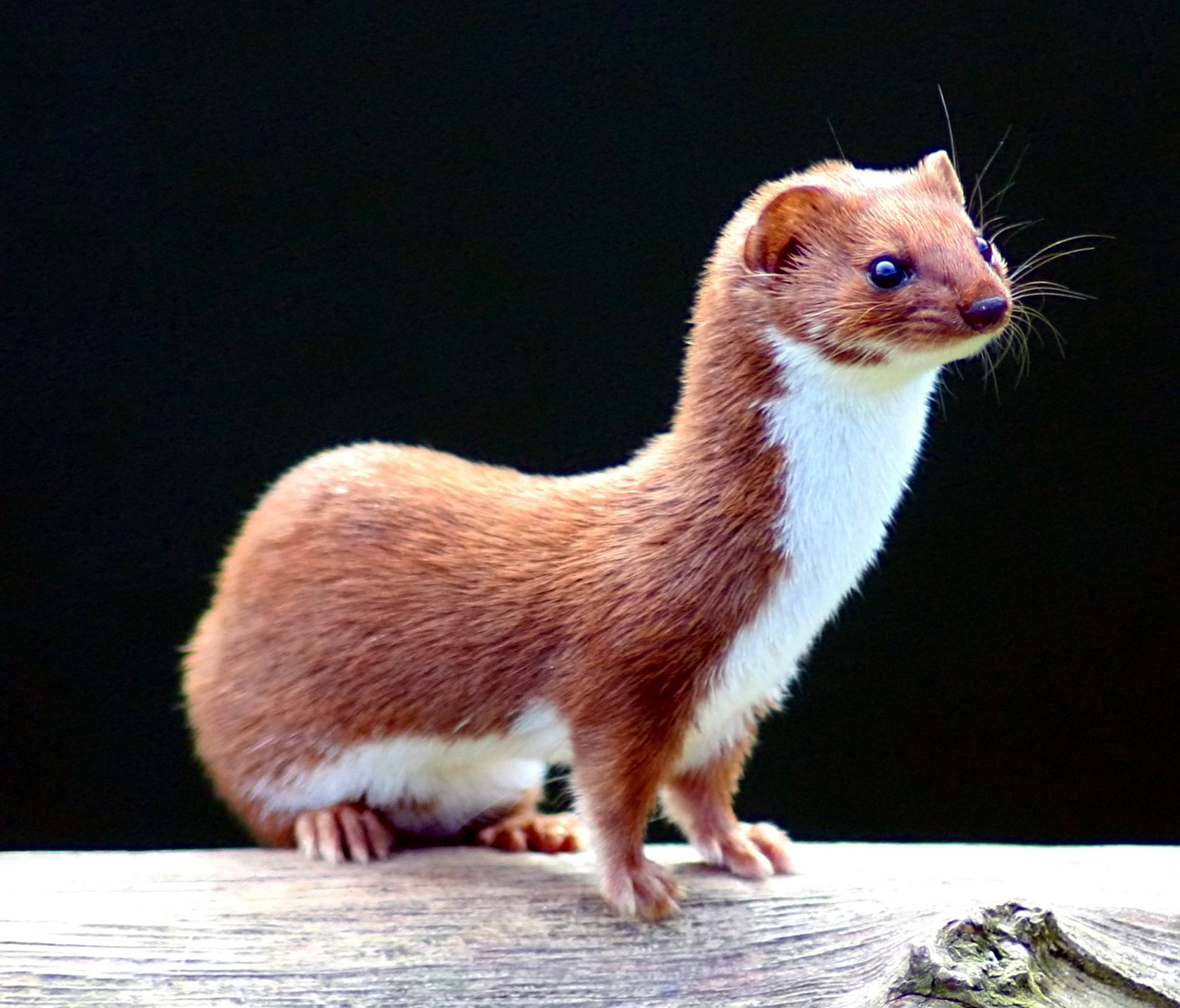
Least weasel

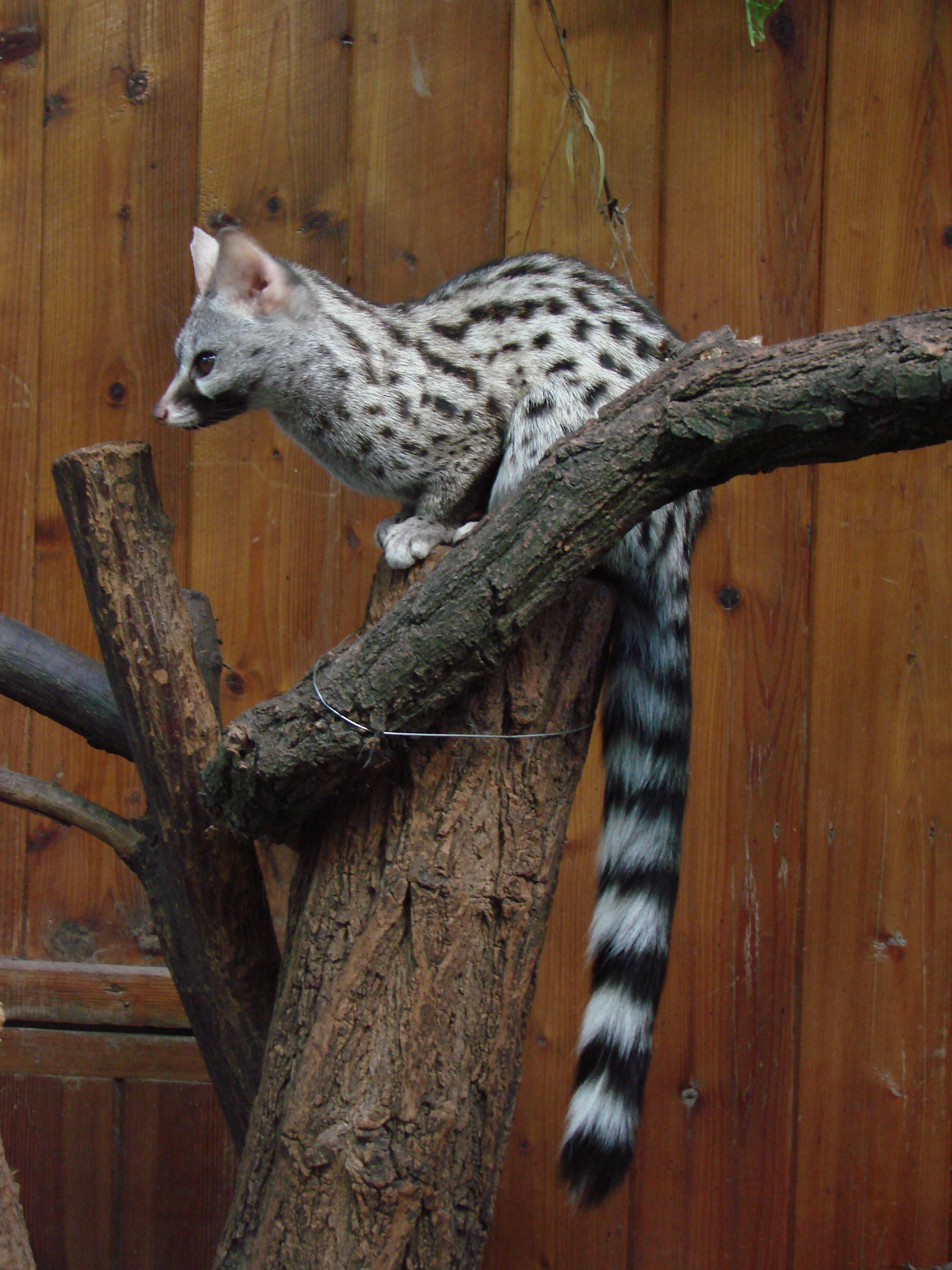
Common genet

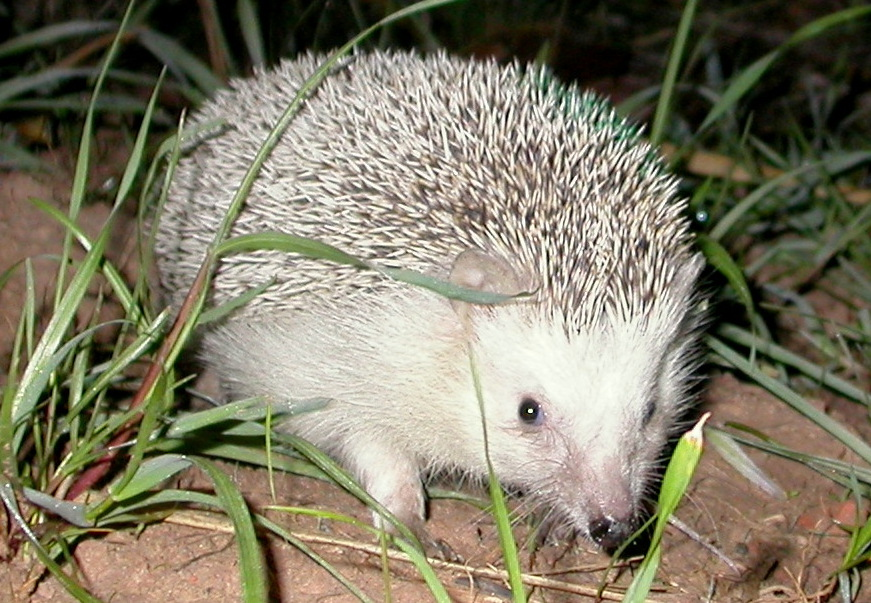
North African hedgehog

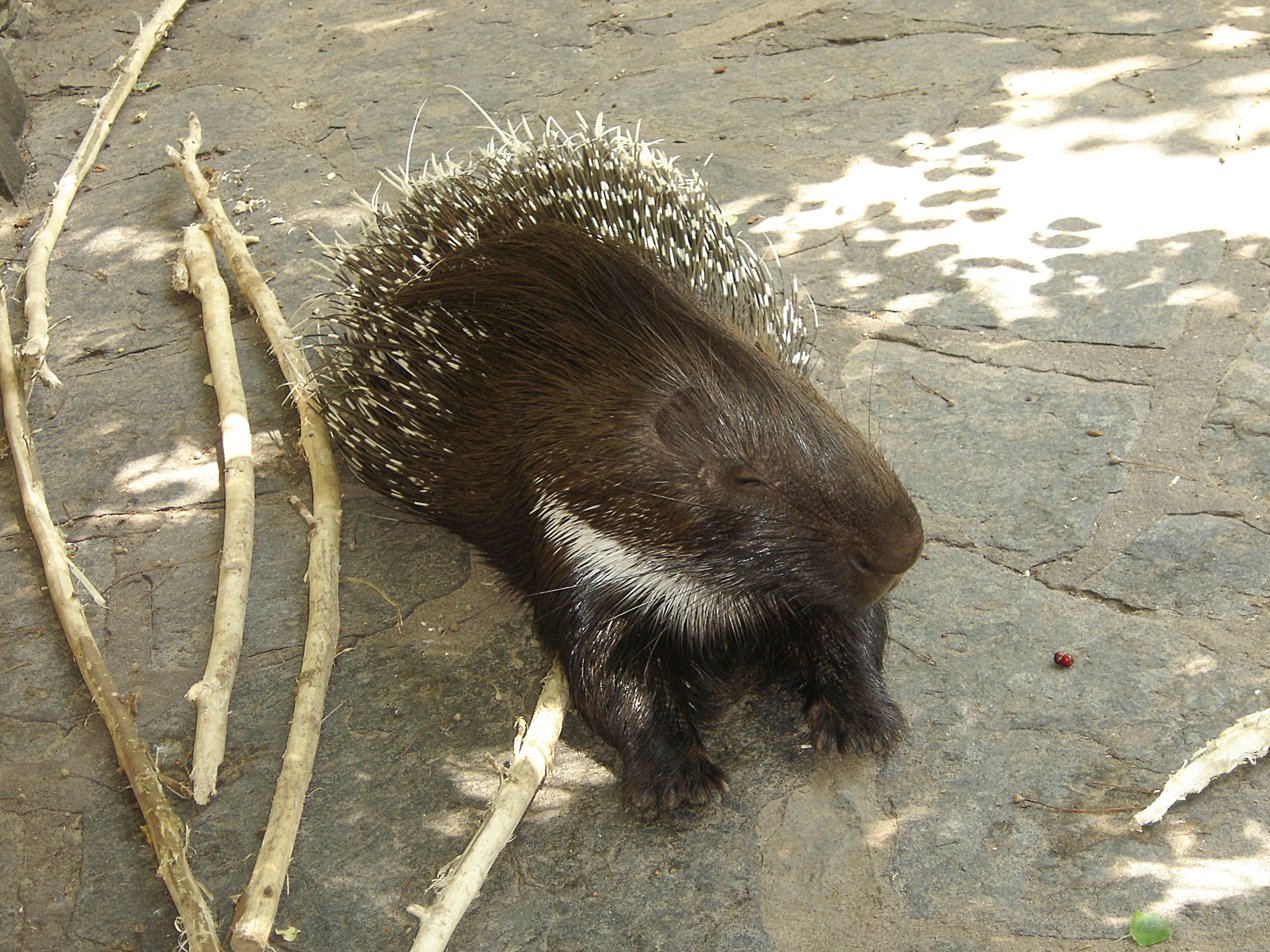
Porcupine

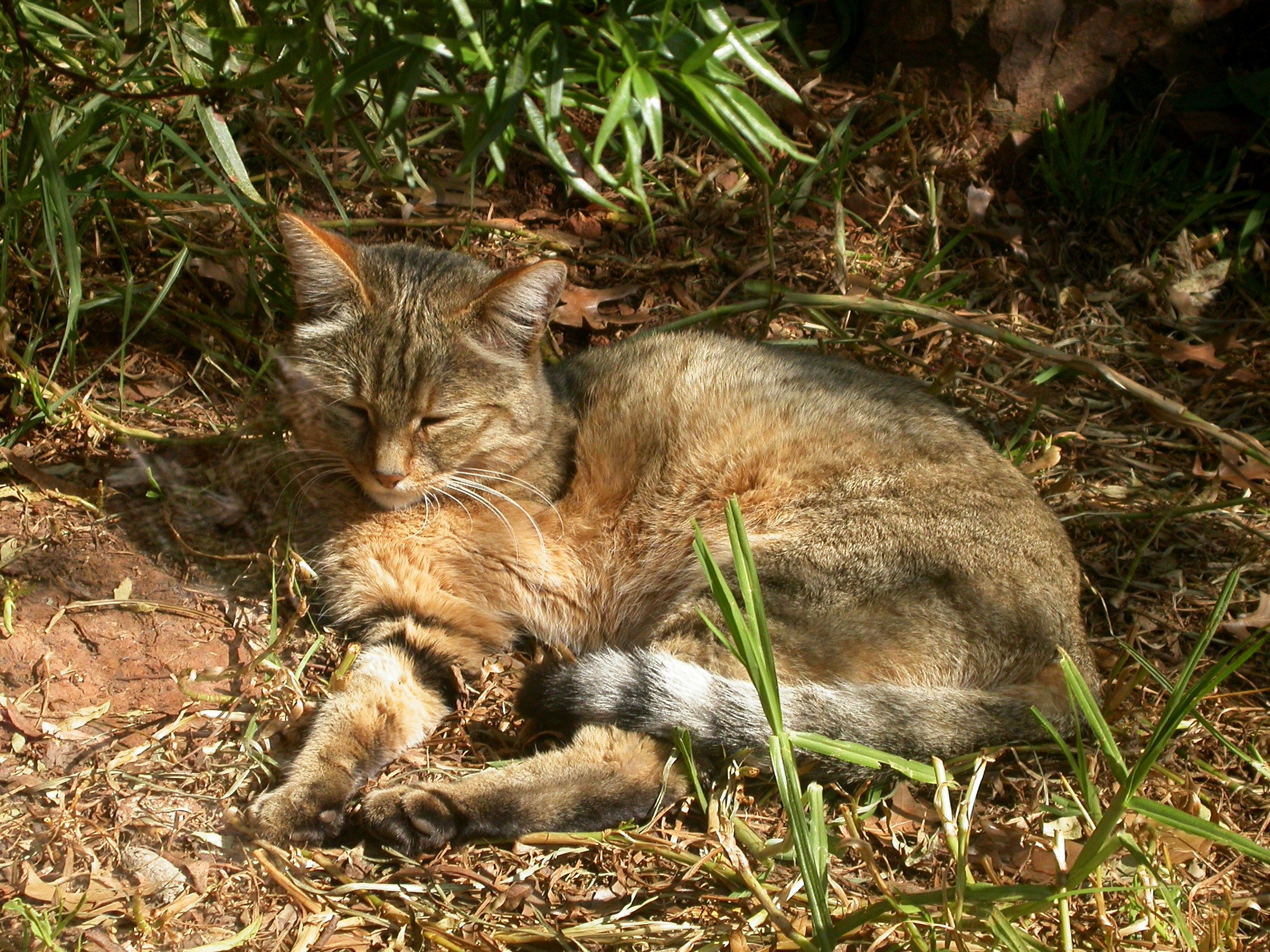
Wildcat

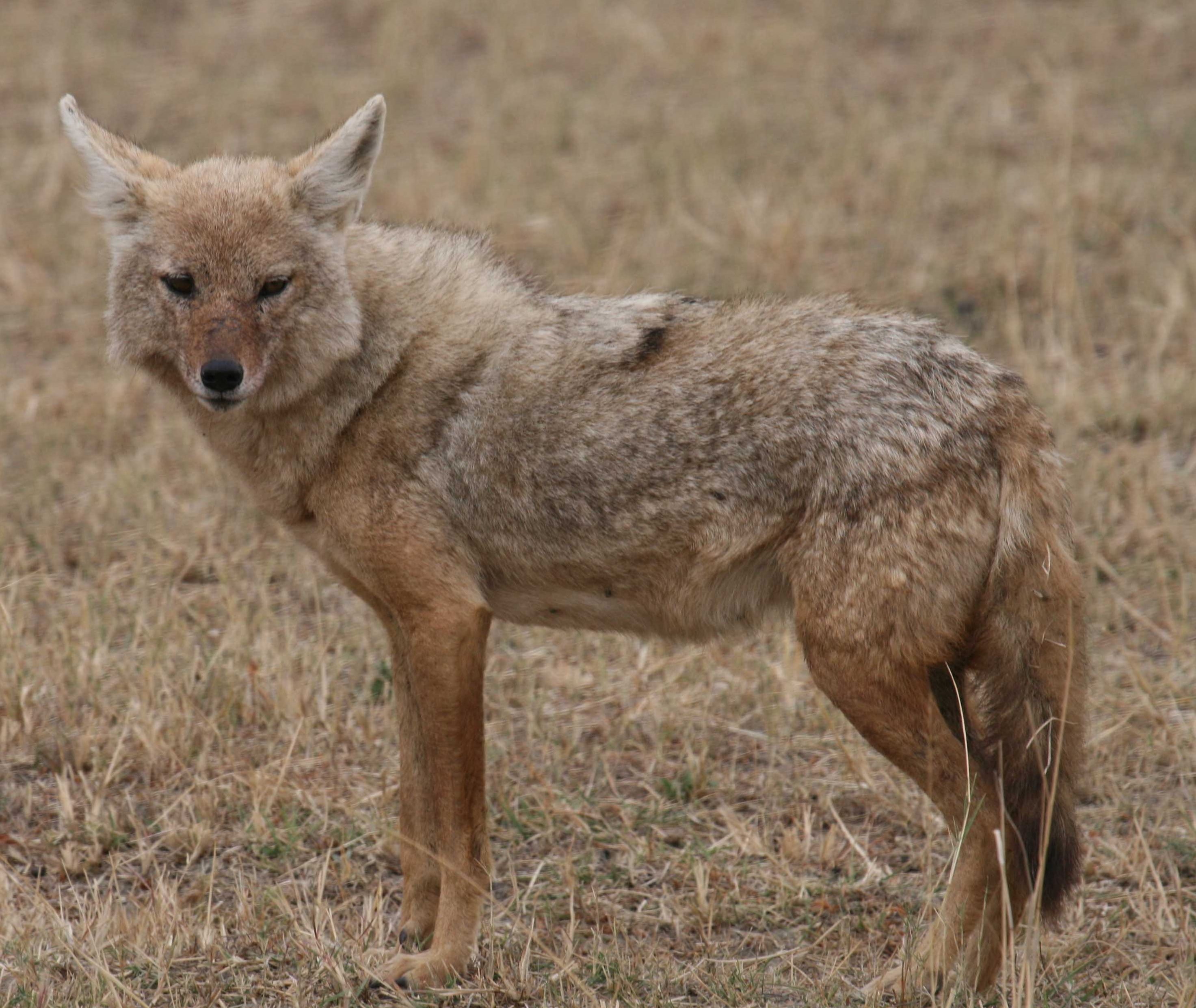
African wolf

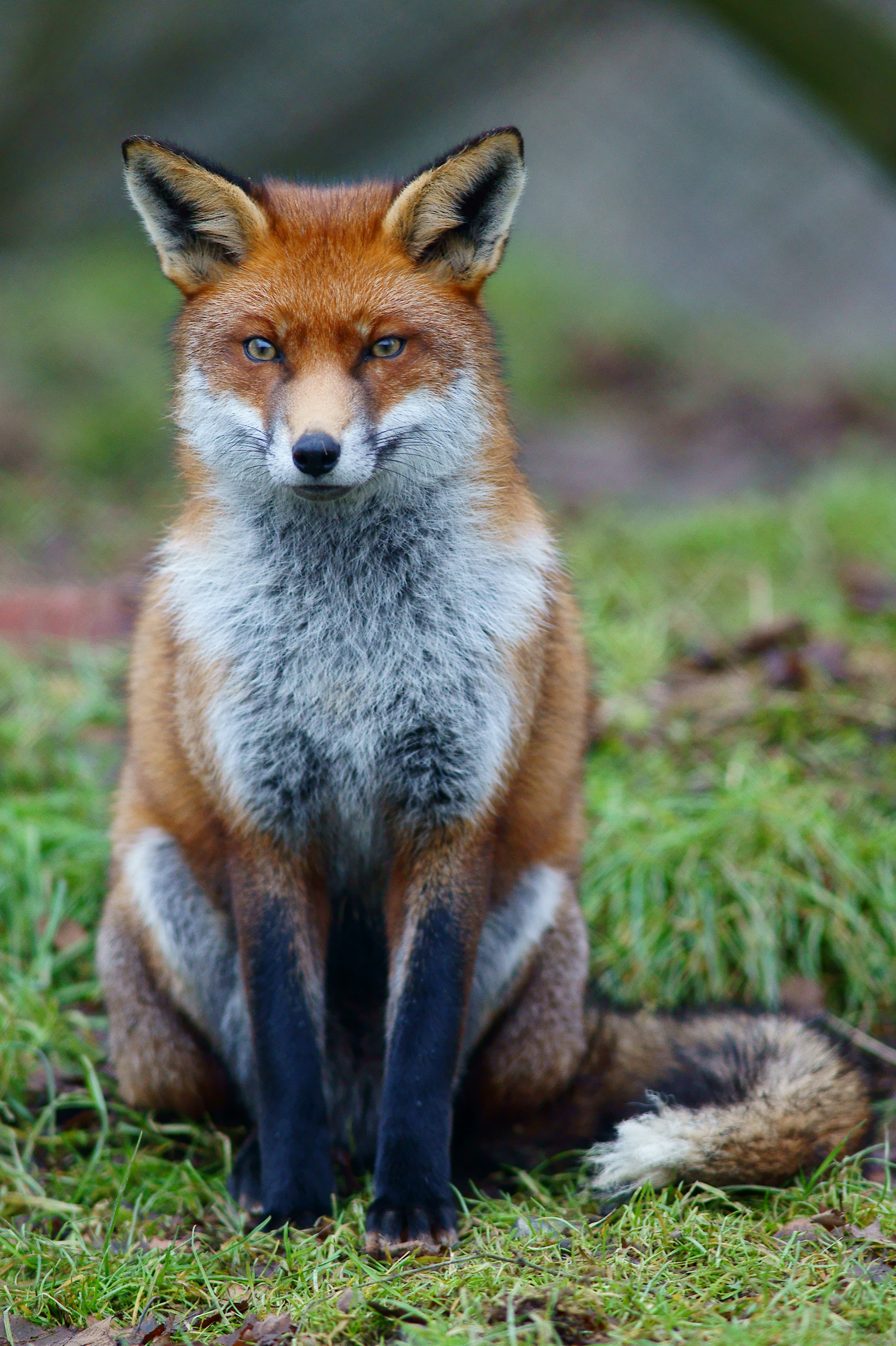
Red fox

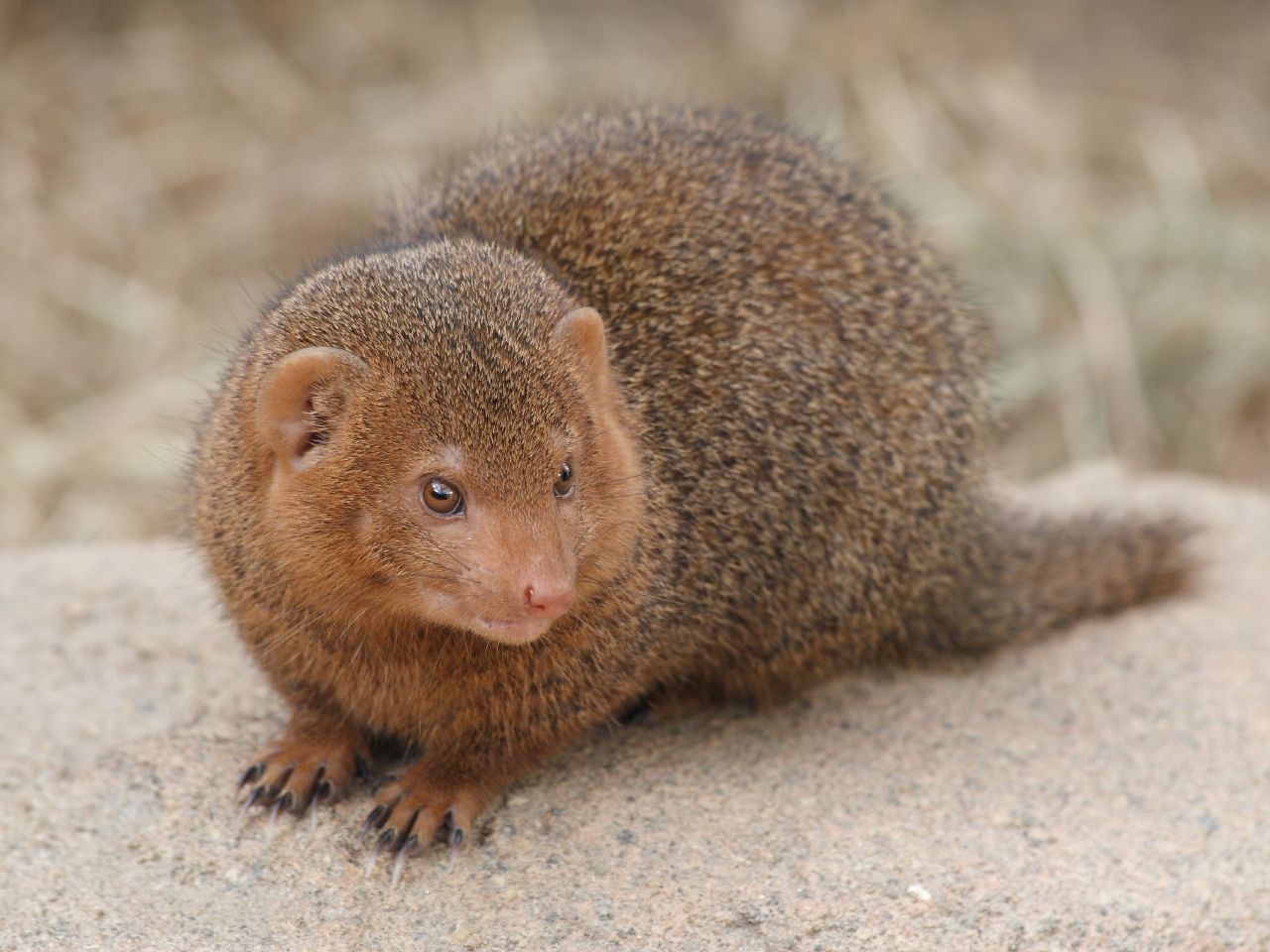
Mongoose

== Photo gallery ==
Location of mountain Bouzgeza

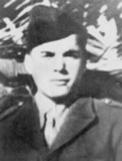
Ali Khodja

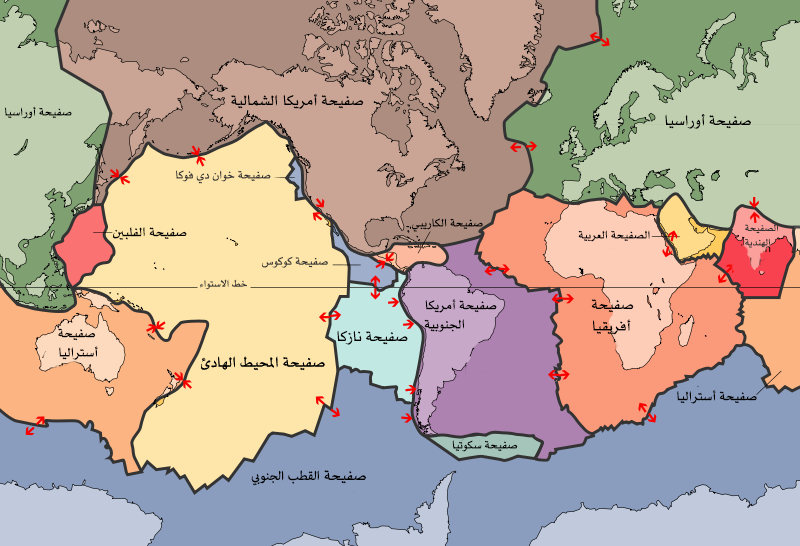
Plate tectonics

== See also ==
- Tell Atlas
- Khachna mountains
- Kabylia
- Boumerdès Province
- East–West Highway (Algeria)
- Bouzareah Mountain
- Corso Valley

=== Videos ===
- "Bouzegza Mountain" on YouTube.
- Bouzegza Mountain on YouTube.
- Bouzegza Mountain on YouTube.
- Bouzegza Mountain on YouTube.
