= Corso Valley =

Valley in Algeria

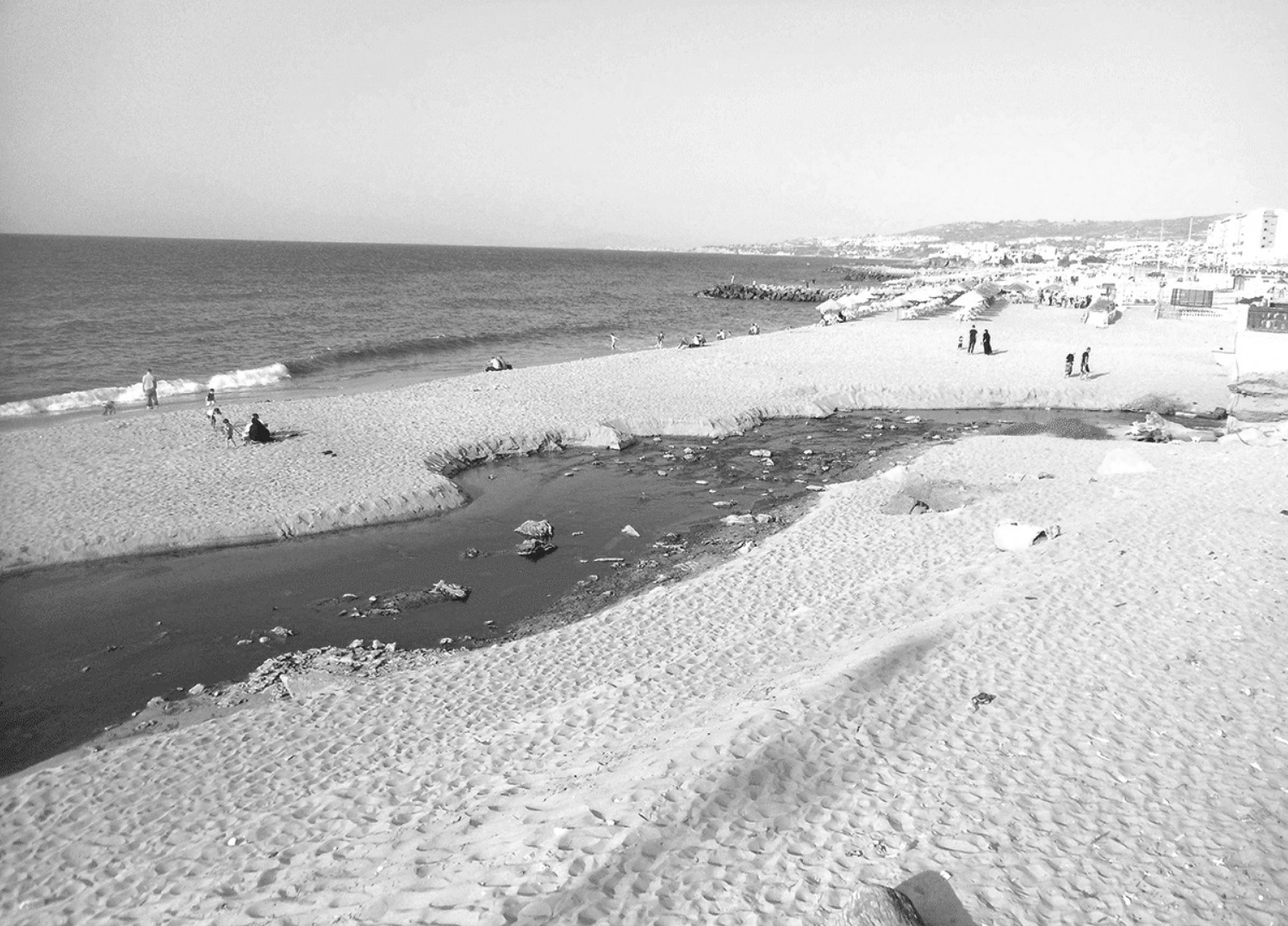

Location
- Country: Algeria

Physical characteristics
- Source: Tell Atlas, Khachna, Boumerdès Province
  - location: Boumerdès Province, Bouzegza Keddara
  - coordinates: 3°29′19.79″N 36°38′11.74″E
  - elevation: 850 Meter
- 2nd source: Tell Atlas, Boumerdès Province
  - location: Boumerdès Province, Beni Amrane
  - coordinates: 3°31′11.87″N 36°39′58.82″E
  - elevation: 670 Meter
- Source confluence: Boumerdès Province
  - location: Tidjelabine, Bouzegza Keddara, Boudouaou
  - elevation: 420 Meter
- Mouth: Boumerdès Province, Boumerdès, Corso (City in Algeria)
  - elevation: 5 Meter
- Length: Boumerdès Province, 20 KM
- Basin size: Mediterranean Sea, 5 Meter

Corso Valley is a river that originates in the Khachna Mountains that flows through the Kabylie region, and ends in the Mediterranean Sea though the east of the town of Corso. The watercourse passes through Boumerdès Province along its route.

== Description ==
Corso Valley is a watercourse in the watershed south of the cities of Corso and Boumerdès, located in Boumerdès Province. The drainage basin of this river spans approximately 50 square kilometers within the Khachna Mountains, east of Mount Bouzegza and north of Mount Garrah.

The streams that form Wadi Corso originate from an elevation of 850 meters in the municipalities of Keddara and Beni Amrane. The river flows through the municipalities of Tidjelabine and Boudouaou before emptying into the Mediterranean Sea at the border between Corso and Boumerdès.

The river is fed by mountain springs, rainfall, and snowmelt, making it an essential waterway in Boumerdès Province. It is bordered by Meraldene River to the east and Wadi Boudouaou to the west.

== Path ==
Corso Valley flows through a single coastal Algerian province, in the Khachna Mountains.

Municipalities in Boumerdès on the "Corso Valley" trail
Number	Boumerdès Province
01	Bouzegza Keddara
02	Beni Amrane
03	Tidjelabine
04	Boudouaou
05	Corso
06	Boumerdès

== Roads ==
Corso Valley intersects with several roads along its course.

Roads in the "Corso Valley" route
Number	Boumerdès Province	Coordinates
01	National Road 5	3°27′8.15″N 36°43′53.63″E
02	National Road 24	3°27′2.24″N 36°45′16.12″E

== Pollution ==
Corso Valley has been affected by water and solid pollution due to urban expansion in the cities of Corso and Boumerdès, as well as their suburbs.

The establishment of the Corso technical landfill has exacerbated this issue, leading to the seepage of leachate into the ground, which has contaminated the watercourse. Additionally, wastewater leaking into the stream bed has contributed to the pollution.

The accumulation of solid and inert materials has narrowed the riverbed along the border between the municipalities of Tidjelabine and Boumerdès, extending to the mouth of the wadi at the Mediterranean Sea. As a result, the pollution has transformed Wadi Corso into a source of unpleasant odors and has attracted harmful insects.

It has been proposed to establish a wastewater treatment station for Wadi Corso before it reaches the beach. Specifically, in the vacant park adjacent to the Sonatrach camp at the border between the municipalities of Boumerdès and Corso.

This pollution not only affects residents along the riverbanks from the heights of the Khachna Mountains to the shores of the Mediterranean Sea but also poses health risks to beachgoers, leading to skin diseases caused by contaminated water in the predominantly touristic Boumerdès region.

In August 2018, polluted water from Wadi Corso inundated a large area of Grand Corso Beach, forcing visitors to evacuate due to unpleasant odors and the danger posed by the contaminated water mixed with seawater, which threatened their skin and overall health.

== Floods ==
Rainwater from the upper regions of the municipalities of Tadjellabine and Boumerdès, along with accumulated rainfall in the municipalities of corso and Boumerdès, causes the Corso River to flood during the rainy season. This flooding occasionally leads to the inundation of certain neighborhoods in Corso city, primarily due to the clogging of stormwater drainage channels with dirt and debris. The river has experienced recurring floods during consecutive rainy seasons, resulting high levels of rainfall that disrupt transportation in the area.

Consequently, residents of Corso are particularly concerned about the risk of sudden flooding in their neighborhoods adjacent to the river, especially with the onset of the first autumn rains each year, which is exacerbated by poor infrastructure in these neighborhoods that does not meet regulatory standards.

Residents of Corso monitor the water levels in the Corso River each winter, fearing that it may flood their homes at any moment. Some individuals choose to evacuate their houses during heavy rainfall, particularly after experiencing multiple floods that necessitated the intervention of civil protection services in previous years, such as the flood in November 2007.

This situation is exacerbated by the urban expansion of Corso towards the east and northeast, where the agricultural soil is impermeable. As a result, all water flowing into the Corso River overflows, impacting residents of the new neighborhoods when levels rise, as was observed in December 2009. Additionally, poor planning of these newly established neighborhoods, characterized by dirt, debris, and leftover construction materials obstructing the roads, contributes to the blockage of drainage channels, further worsening the impacts of sudden flooding in the Corso River.

== Initialization ==
Partial rehabilitation of the Corso River commenced in September 2018, following a pollution overflow that affected Grande Plage de Corso and resulted in a decline in visitor attendance. An environmental investigation along the riverbanks revealed that contaminated water was being used to irrigate fields and greenhouses located west of the river during the height of summer.

Additionally, leakage from the Corso technical landfill exacerbated the pollution issues. Investigators from the Gendarmerie Nationale in Algeria discovered multiple construction companies that had established large housing developments east of the city of Corso.

These buildings were not connected to sewage networks, resulting in the direct discharge of hazardous wastewater into the river, in blatant violation of regulations. The river rehabilitation project was initiated to uncover all illegal drainage systems and sources that discharge untreated wastewater directly into the river.

== See also ==
- List of rivers of Algeria
- Ministry of Water Resources and Environment
- Discharge regime
- Tell Atlas
- Khachna
- Boumerdès Province
- List of beaches
- Tourism in Algeria
- Lists of tourist attractions
