= Boudouaou District =

Coordinates: 36°43′53″N 3°24′17″E

Boudouaou District دائرة بودواو
- District
- Map of Algeria highlighting Boumerdès Province
- Country: Algeria
- Province: Boumerdès
- District seat: Boudouaou

Population (1998)
  - Total: 71,028
- Time zone: UTC+01 (CET)
- Municipalities: 3

Boudouaou is a district in Boumerdès Province, Algeria. It was named after its capital, Boudouaou.

== Municipalities ==
The district is further divided into 5 municipalities:

- Boudouaou
- Boudouaou-El-Bahri
- Bouzegza Keddara
- El Kharrouba
- Ouled Hedadj

== History ==
=== French conquest ===
- Expedition of the Col des Beni Aïcha (1837)
- First Battle of Boudouaou (1837)
- First Battle of the Issers (1837)
- Battle of Alma (1871)

=== Salafist terrorism ===
- 2006 Boudouaou bombing (8 August 2006)

== Notable people ==
- Ahmed Mahsas, Algerian politician and writer
- Rachid Mimouni, Algerian writer
- Walid Derrardja, Algerian footballer
