= Isser District =

Coordinates: 36°43′28″N 3°40′12″E

Issers District دائرة يسر
- District
- Map of Algeria highlighting Boumerdès Province

- Map of Boumerdès Province highlighting Isser District
- Country: Algeria
- Province: Boumerdès
- District seat: Isser

Population (1998)
  - Total: 67,228
- Time zone: UTC+01 (CET)
- Municipalities: 3

Issers is a district in Boumerdès Province, Algeria. It was named after its capital, Isser.

== Municipalities ==
The district is further divided into 4 municipalities:

- Isser
- Si Mustapha
- Chabet El Ameur
- Timezrit

== History ==
=== French conquest ===
- First Battle of the Issers (1837)

=== Salafist terrorism ===
- 2008 Issers bombing (19 August 2008)

== Zawiya ==
- Zawiya Thaalibia

== Notable people ==
- Sidi Abder Rahman El Thaelebi, Algerian Islamic scholar
- Mohamed Aïchaoui, Algerian journalist and resistant against French colonization.
- Raïs Hamidou, Algerian privateer.
- Ali Laskri, Algerian politician.
