= Battle of Bouzegza =

- Part of Algerian War
Date	4–12 August 1957
Location	Bouzegza Keddara, French Algeria
Result	Algerian victory on 4 August; French victory on 12 August

Belligerents
France	ALN

Commanders and leaders
Jacques Massu; Jacques Allard	Commander Azzedine; Si Boualem †; Colonel Nedjadi Mohamed

Casualties and losses
French Claim: 29 killed 12 wounded 1 captured (4 August) 10 killed (12 August); Algerian claim: ~600 killed (4 August) Unknown (12 August)	French Claim: 16 killed (4 August) 98 killed (12 August); Algerian claim: 1 wounded (4 August) Dozen dead (Commando) Si Boualem's ferkas' decimated (12 August)

The Battle of Bouzegza took place during the Algerian War in the Berber-speaking region of the Adrar Azegzaw massif (Djebel Bouzegza, which means "Bouzegza Mountain"), at the far eastern end of the Mitidja Plain.

On August 4, 8, and 12, 1957, Ali Khodja of the National Liberation Army (ALN), reinforced with local units, faced French Army units commanded by several generals, including Jacques Massu.

== Before 4 August 1957 ==
According to the French, the battle followed an ambush near Médéa in late July 1957 against a section of the 1st Foreign Parachute Regiment, in which 14 men were killed and eight wounded. According to the Algerians, a medic from the local unit in Palestro commanded by Si Boualem, captured in a guerrilla action, told the French his unit was in Bouzegza. He knew it was not but did not know Ali Khodja was there.

== The Battle ==
=== 4th August ===
In spite of its numbers and considerable resources, the French army suffered a heavy defeat on the 4th of August. The 2nd squadron of the 2nd Regiment of Dragoons mistook Ali Khodja's fighters for French soldiers and lost many men. Major Azzedine said in 2009 that an article in the daily Le Monde, published the day after the incident, reported French casualties of around 600 dead, wounded, and missing, and according to him the fighters of the Wilaya IV only sustained a few wounded. The article in question, quoting French military authorities, actually said that only 21 French were killed and 18 wounded. The history of the French 2nd Dragoon Regiment stated that the losses include 29 killed, 12 wounded, and 2 missing. According to the FLN, the commandos suffered only one wounded, the rebels killed by the French army being moussebilines and civilians.

=== 12th August ===
Ali Khodja was joined by other units. The NLP soldiers were severely attacked on the 12th by the paratroopers of the 2nd Marine Infantry Parachute Regiment and the 1st Foreign Parachute Regiment, the French recovered on this occasion some of the weapons captured by the rebels. According to Commander Azzedine, some ferkas under the orders of Si Boualem were practically decimated, while a dozen men from the commando were killed. Thanks to his information networks and his knowledge of the terrain, Ali Khodja managed to disengage and retreat with the minimum damage possible (according to Commander Azzedine: a few killed and a dozen wounded).

== Bibliography ==
- Yves Courrière, La guerre d'Algérie, Fayard, 2001 (ISBN 2213611211).
- Benjamin Stora; Renaud de Rochebrune (October 13, 2016). La guerre d'Algérie vue par les Algériens. Vol. 2. Editions Denoël. p. 36. ISBN 9782207111932.

== See also ==
- Algerian War
- French Algeria
