= Timezrit =

Timezrit may refer to:

- Timezrit, Béjaïa - a commune or municipality of Béjaïa province, Algeria
- Timezrit, Boumerdès - a commune or municipality of Boumerdès province, Algeria
