= Si Mustapha =

Coordinates: 36.7247°N 3.6153°E

- Commune and town
- Country: Algeria
- Province: Boumerdès Province

Population (1998)
  - Total: 9,015
- Time zone: UTC+1 (CET)

Si Mustapha is a town and commune in the Isser District of Boumerdès Province, Algeria. At the time of the 1998 census it had a population of 9,015.

Previously named Blad Guitoune ("land of the tent"), it was renamed Félix-Faure in 1899 during the colonial period, after the former French president Félix Faure. After independence in 1962, it was given the new name of Si Mustapha, after the nom de guerre of the ALN fighter Mohamed Saoudi, who died nearby in combat on 25 November 1958.

A 4th-century octagonal mausoleum formerly found there was demolished in 1905.

== History ==
- First Battle of the Issers (1837)

== Notable people ==
- Mohamed Aïchaoui (1921-1959), an Algerian journalist and resistant against French colonization.
