= 2011 Boudouaou rail accident =

Train wreck in Algeria

Details
- Date: 22 August 2011; 11:15 am
- Location: Boumerdès Province
- Coordinates: 36.7531054°N 3.4203953°E
- Country: Algeria
- Line: Algiers to Thénia
- Operator: National Company for Rail Transport
- Incident type: Train wreck

Statistics
- Trains: 2
- Passengers: 500
- Deaths: 1
- Injured: 24

The 2011 Boudouaou rail accident is a train wreck which occurred on 22 August 2011 when two trains collided in Algeria killing 1 people and injuring 24 people.

== Collision ==
Leaving from the Algiers station to Thénia station on the morning of 22 August 2011, two trains collided between Boudouaou and Corso in the Boumerdès Province following a stop marked by the first freight train which was driving ahead, and which the conductors of the second train carrying the passengers would not have noticed.

The National Company for Rail Transport (SNTF) investigation then affirmed that the Electric multiple unit self-propelled passenger train was traveling at maximum speed while it should only travel 10 km per hour to allow the freight train in front of it to move forward and to arrive at Corso train station.

The shock which took place at 11:15 in the morning caused the derailment of two cars, one car of each train and which were involved in the collision.

== Victims ==
Travelers injured in the collision were not in danger according to local medical sources, as the majority of travelers were shocked by what happened and others were slightly injured. No cases of fracture were recorded and the cuts reported were not serious at the scene of the train accident.

== See also ==
- List of rail accidents (2010–2019)
- National Company for Rail Transport (SNTF)
