= Ali Laskri =

Algerian politician (born 1955)

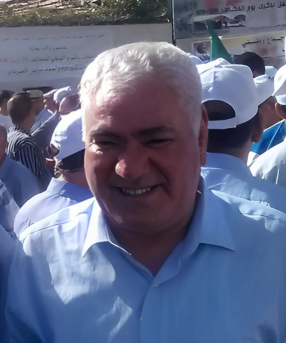

President of Socialist Forces Front
- Incumbent
- Assumed office 12 December 2019

Deputy (APN): 2017 Algerian legislative election
- In office 4 May 2017 – 17 March 2019

Deputy (APN): 2012 Algerian legislative election
- In office 10 May 2012 – 4 May 2017

Deputy (APW): 2002 Algerian local election
- In office 2002–2007

Personal details
- Born: علي لعسكري; August 20, 1955 (age 71) Chabet el Ameur, Algeria
- Party: Socialist Forces Front
- Education: University of Algiers
- Occupation: University of Boumerdès
- Profession: Board administrator

Ali Laskri (born 20 August 1955) is an Algerian politician. He is the leader of the political opposition Socialist Forces Front party in Algeria.

== Biography ==
Ali Laskri was born in 1955 in the commune of Chabet el Ameur in the current Boumerdès Province within the lower Kabylia.

After elementary studies in his native, he obtained a post-graduation diploma specializing in management and administration sciences at the University of Algiers.

He then began a professional career as a consulting administrator at the University of Boumerdès.

== Political career ==
Laskri joined the opposition Socialist Forces Front (FFS) party in January 1990, and was then elected chairman of the People's Municipal Assembly (APC) of the commune of Boumerdès during the 1990 Algerian local elections on 12 June 1990 and then a member of the FFS national council at the party's first congress in 1991.

He was elected in 1993 as political coordinator of the FFS in the Boumerdès Province, when he already held the post of organics officer at the level of this body.

He was then appointed in 1997 as national secretary of the party in charge of monitoring the world of work, then left this post at the end of 1998.

On the occasion of the 1999 Algerian presidential election of 15 April 1999, Laskri held the post of campaign director for party president Hocine Aït Ahmed in the province of Boumerdès.

During the third FFS congress in 2000, he was elected chairman of the organizing committee, and in the meantime was the party's first federal secretary in the wilaya of Boumerdès.

During the 2002 Algerian local elections, he led the list of the People's Provincial Assembly (APW) of the FFS in the wilaya of Boumerdès, then was appointed in 2003 as national secretary in charge of solidarity, before being appointed to the position of first secretary of the party in 2004 where he will assume this responsibility until April 2007.

He was again appointed as the first secretary of the FFS from 2011 to 2013, and was in the meantime elected during the 2012 Algerian legislative election on 10 May 2012 as a deputy of the FFS in the People's National Assembly (APN) representing the wilaya of Boumerdès.

He was partisanly appointed as chairman of the political strategy commission of the national council and member of the FFS ethics committee until 2013, and was re-elected in his mandate as national deputy in the 2017 Algerian legislative election on 4 May 2017.

On 17 March 2019, following the 2019 protests in Algeria, he resigned from his post as deputy with other elected members of the APN.

== See also ==
- Socialist Forces Front
