= Chabet el Ameur =

Coordinates: 36°38′N 3°42′E

- Commune and town
- Interactive map of Chabet el Ameur
- Country: Algeria
- Province: Boumerdès Province

Population (1998)
  - Total: 30,223
- Time zone: UTC+1 (CET)

Chabet el Ameur (Arabic: شعبة العامر, Kabyle: Tacɛabet) is a town and commune in Boumerdès Province, Algeria. According to the 1998 census it has a population of 30,223.

== History ==
- First Battle of the Issers (1837)

== Notable people ==
- Ali Laskri, Algerian politician.
