= Keddara Dam =

Dam in Algeria

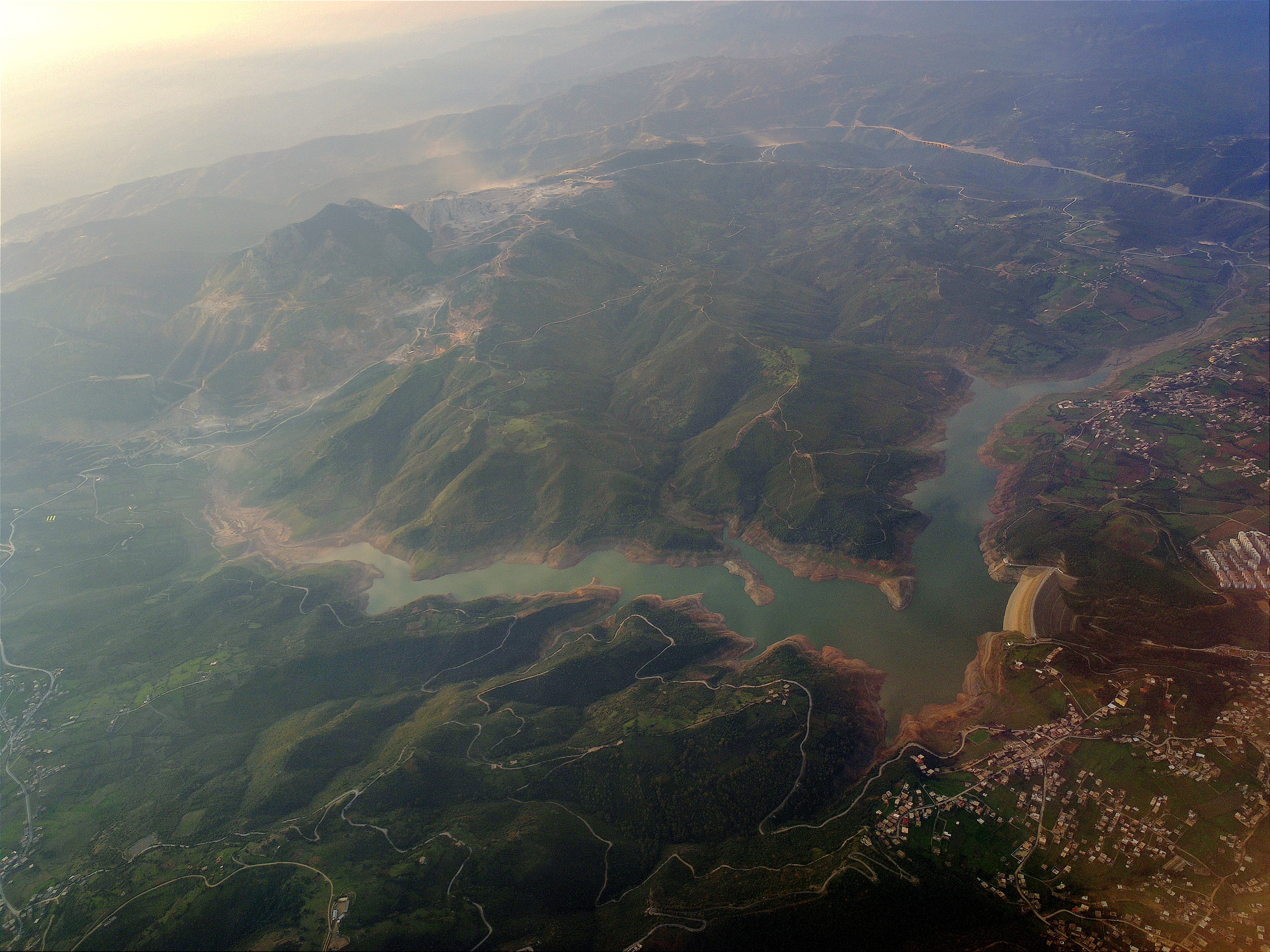

- Location within Algeria
- Official name: Barrage Keddara
- Country: Algeria
- Location: Keddara
- Coordinates: 36°39′02″N 03°24′58″E
- Status: Operational
- Construction began: 1982
- Opening date: 1987

Dam and spillways
- Type of dam: Embankment, rock-fill clay core
- Impounds: Boudouaou River
- Height: 108 m (354 ft)
- Length: 470 m (1,542 ft)
- Width (crest): 12 m (39 ft)
- Width (base): 380 m (1,247 ft)
- Dam volume: 4,081,000 m^{3} (5,337,746 cu yd)

Reservoir
- Total capacity: 146,500,000 m^{3} (118,769 acre⋅ft)
- Surface area: 5.2 km^{2} (2 sq mi)

The Keddara Dam, or Barrage Keddara, is an embankment dam 6 km (4 mi) northwest of Keddara on the Boudouaou River in Boumerdès Province, Algeria. Constructed between 1982 and 1987 by Yugoslav company Hidrotehnika, the primary purpose of the dam is water supply for irrigation and municipal use in Algiers which is located 35 km (22 mi) to the west. The dam's reservoir has a capacity of 146,500,000 m^{3} (118,769 acre⋅ft) which is collected from drainage and the Hamiz Dam 7.6 km (5 mi) to the west and the Beni Amrane Dam 17 km (11 mi) to the east.
