= Timezrit, Boumerdès =

Coordinates: 36°40′24″N 3°48′23″E

- Commune and town
- Interactive map of Timezrit, Boumerdès
- Country: Algeria
- Province: Boumerdès Province

Population (1998)
  - Total: 10,699
- Time zone: UTC+1 (CET)

Timezrit, Boumerdès (Arabic نيمزريت, Kabyle Timeẓrit) is a town and commune in the Isser District of Boumerdès Province, Algeria, on the western slopes of Sidi Ali Bounab. According to the 1998 census it has a population of 10,699.

== History ==
In the early 19th century the hill of Timezrit was the location of a mosque with a minaret and a market held on Sundays, Had-Timezrit. This was the central market of the Iflisen Umellil, shared between the Oulad Yahia Moussa, the Rouafa, and the Beni-Hammad. Nearby was the village of Ihaddaden.
