= Ministry of Water Resources and Environment =

Government ministry of Algeria

Ministry of Water Resources and Environment (Arabic: وزارة الموارد المائية والبيئة, French: Ministre des Ressources en Eau et de l’Environnement) is the Algerian Ministry responsible for matters relating to water within the Algerian government. It is sometimes called "MWR", having its headquarters at Kouba, Algiers.
