= El Kharrouba =

Coordinates: 36°39′28″N 3°24′23″E

- Commune and town
- Country: Algeria
- Province: Boumerdès Province

Population (1998)
  - Total: 8,143
- Time zone: UTC+1 (CET)

El Kharrouba is a town and commune in Boumerdès Province, Algeria. According to the 1998 census it has a population of 8,143.

== History ==
- First Battle of the Issers (1837)
