= Corso (City in Algeria) =

Corso, Boumerdés قورصو
- Commune and town

- Location within Algeria
- Coordinates: 36.756500°N 3.43333°E
- Country: Algeria
- Province: Boumerdès Province
- District: Boumerdès District

Area
  - Total: 8.65 sq mi (22.41 km^{2})

Population (2008)
  - Total: 20,705
  - Density: 2,390/sq mi (924/km^{2})
- Time zone: UTC+1 (CET)
- Area code: 3519

Corso (قورصو in Arabic) is a city in Boumerdès Province, Algeria located 25 km east of Algiers. According to the 2008 census, this town has a population of 20,705.

== Localities ==
The municipality is composed of two main cities, the city of Corso (chief town), and the agglomeration of Berrahmoune and several secondary agglomerations like Traykia, Haouch Mahfoud Ben Abdelkader, and Ouled Ben Bakhta.

== History ==
- First Battle of the Issers (1837)
