= Boudouaou-El-Bahri =

Boudouaou-El-Bahri بودواو البحرى
- Commune and town
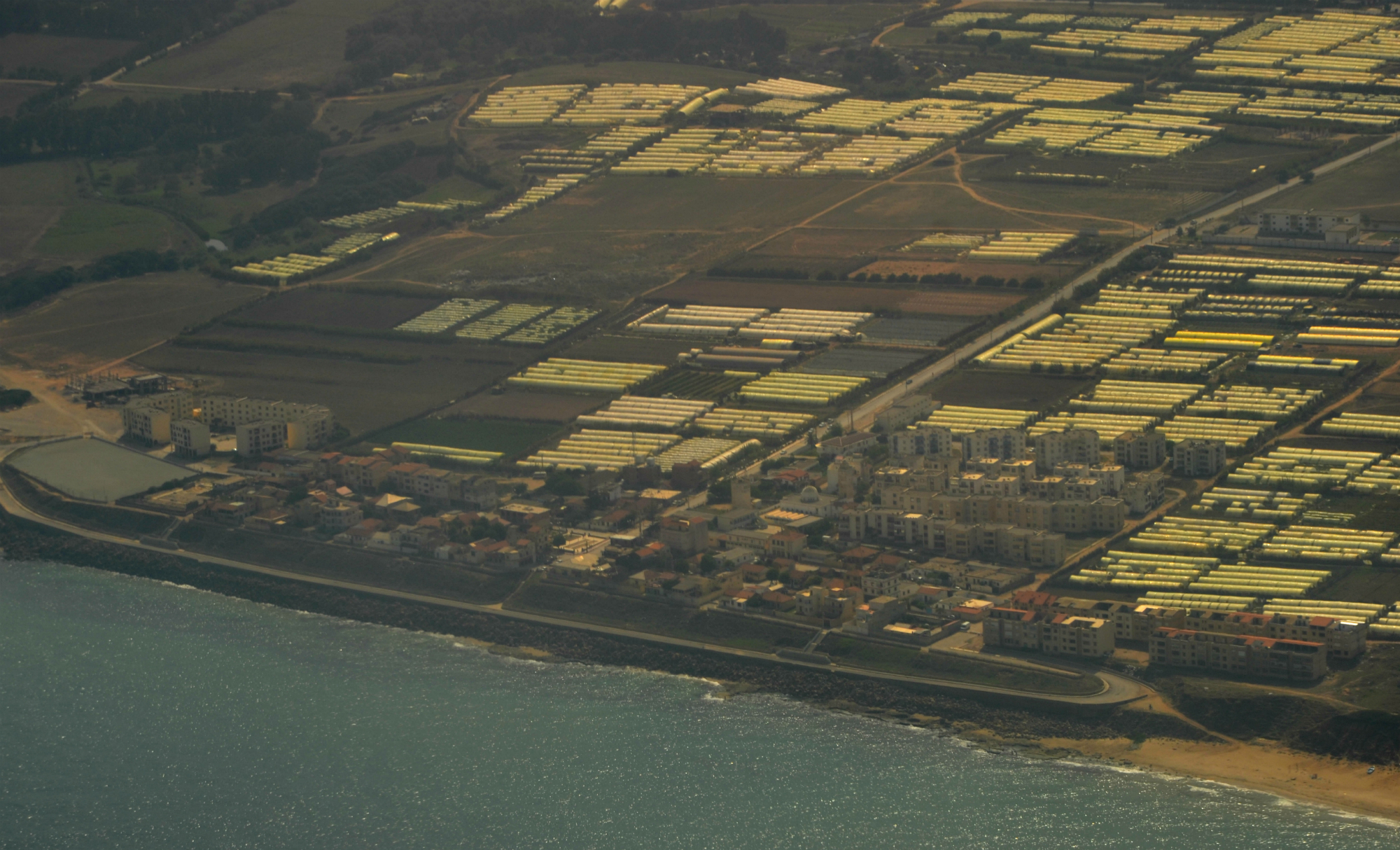

- Location within Algeria
- Coordinates: 36.7732001°N 3.3872711°E
- Country: Algeria
- Province: Boumerdès Province

Population (1998)
  - Total: 10,512
- Time zone: UTC+1 (CET)

Boudouaou-El-Bahri is a town and commune in Boumerdès Province, Algeria. According to the 1998 census it has a population of 10,512.

== History ==
- First Battle of the Issers (1837)
