= Bouzegza Keddara =

Coordinates: 36°37′31″N 3°28′46″E

- Commune and town
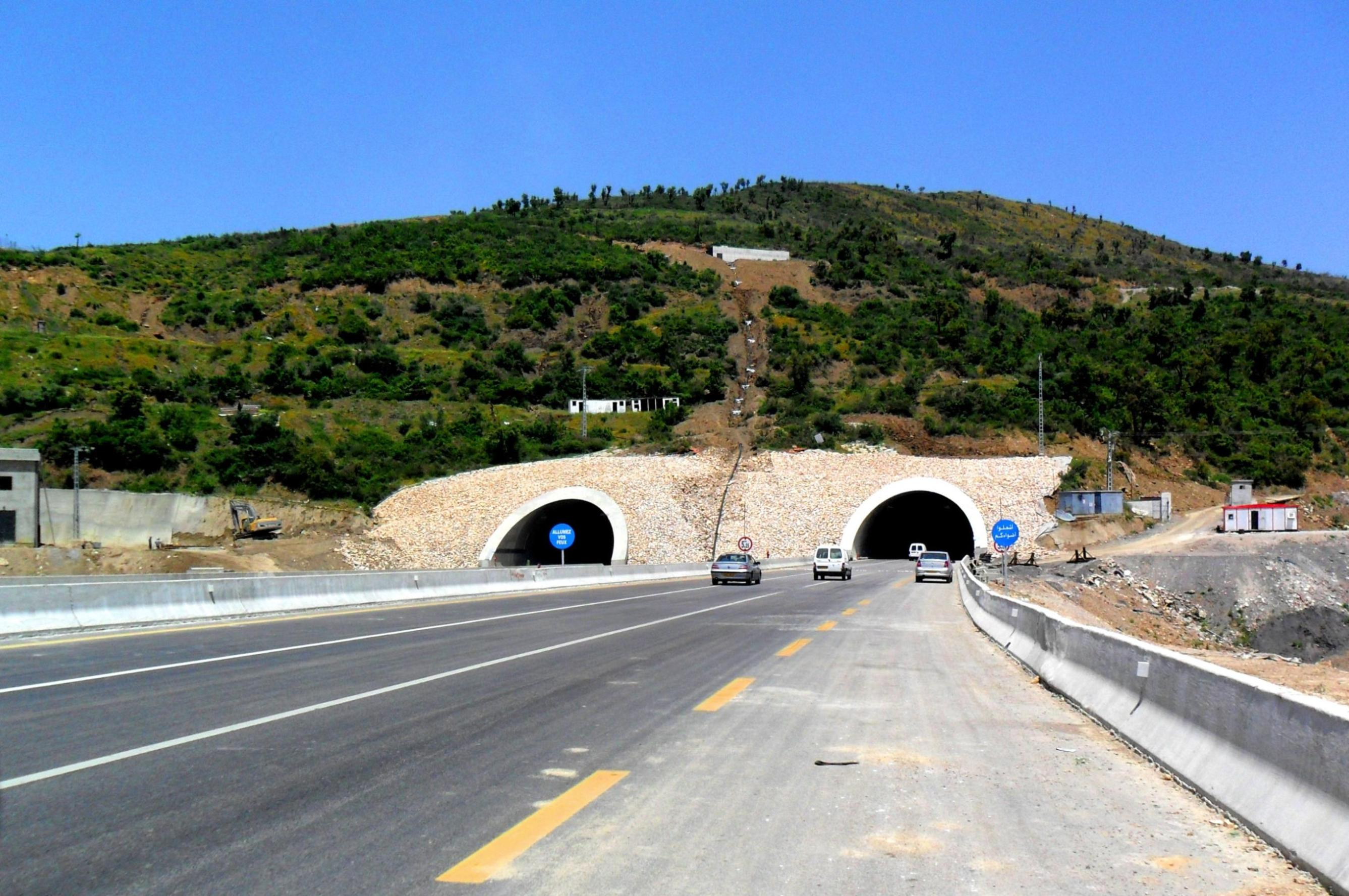
- Interactive map of Bouzegza Keddara
- Country: Algeria
- Province: Boumerdès Province

Population (1998)
  - Total: 8,484
- Time zone: UTC+1 (CET)

Bouzegza Keddara is a town and commune in Boumerdès Province, Algeria.

== Population ==
According to the 1998 census it has a population of 8,484.

== History ==
- First Battle of the Issers (1837)
