= Khachna =

Mountain range in Algeria

Khachna Massif
- Adrar n Kheshna
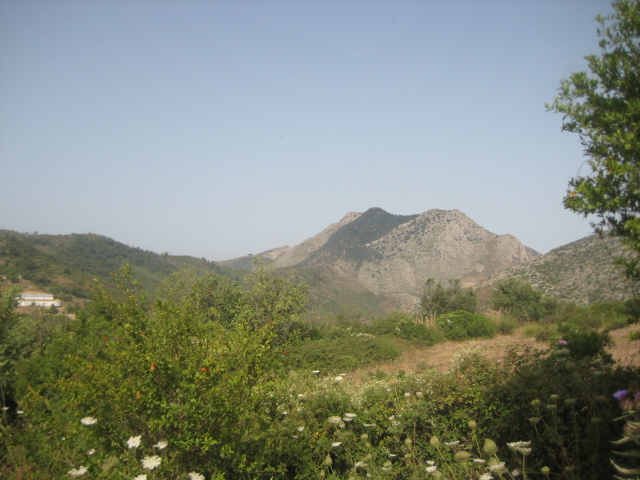

Highest point
- Peak: Bouzegza Mountain, Bouzegza Keddara
- Elevation: 1,032 m (3,386 ft)
- Coordinates: 36°43′40″N 3°33′14″E

Geography
- Location within Algeria
- Location: Kabylia
- Country: Algeria
- Regions: Boumerdès Province; Bouira Province

Geology
- Formed by: Tell Atlas
- Mountain type: Mountain range

The Khachna Range (Berber Adrar n Kheshna) is a mountain range of the Tell Atlas, part of the Atlas Mountain System. It is located in Kabylie, Algeria.

== Geography ==
The Khachna is a massif made up of two differentiated ranges, one in the north between Thénia and Zemmouri, and the other in the south between Thénia and Lakhdaria.

Its highest point, Bouzegza Mount known in Kabylian as Athrar Azegzaw, has an elevation of 1,033 metres (3,389 ft) and it is located in the southern subrange.

Other notable summits are the 710 m high Djerrah Mount, a peak located in the central area of the massif, a second highest point of the southern subrange.

== Villages ==
This mountain range is home to dozens of villages including:

- A
  - Ahl El Koudia
  - Ahl El Oued
  - Aït Abdelhadi
  - Aït Afra
  - Aït Ali
  - Aït Dahmane
  - Aït Hamadouche
  - Aït Salah
  - Aït Si Amar
  - Aït Si Saïd
  - Azela
- B
  - Baloul
  - Belhasnet
  - Ben Daoud
  - Ben Younes
  - Beni Arab
  - Beni Fouda
  - Beni Khelifa
  - Berreghlou
  - Bou Ismaïl
  - Bouaïdel
  - Bouchelaghem
  - Boukaraï
  - Boukhanfar
  - Bouredjouane
- C
  - Chorfa
- D
  - Debagha
  - Djaouna
  - Djenah
  - Doukane
  - Draâ Ben Hadhoum
- E
  - El Bor
  - El Azizia
- F
  - Fekhara
- G
  - Ghazibaouene
  - Gueddara
  - Gueraïchene
- H
  - Hadadcha
  - Haddada
  - Hadj Ahmed
  - Hini
- L
  - Louz
- M
  - Mahrane
  - Mahsas
  - Medjber
  - Meraïel
  - Meraldene
  - Merchicha
  - Mezala
- O
  - Oued Djenane
  - Ouled Ali
  - Ouled Bellemou
  - Ouled Bendou
  - Ouled Bessa
  - Ouled Bouhmed
  - Ouled Boumerdès
  - Ouled Djerrah
  - Ouled Hocine
  - Ouled Mahmoud
  - Ouled Salah
- S
  - Sidi Fredj
  - Sidi Yahia
  - Skhirat
  - Souiga
  - Soumâa
- T
  - Tabrahimt
  - Tachehat
  - Talamali
  - Talilt
  - Talmat
  - Tamsaout
  - Tebabkha
  - Thellath
  - Tigrine
  - Tijijga
  - Timizar
  - Titouna
  - Tiza
  - Tizouighine
  - Toulmout
  - Touzaline
- Z
  - Zaatra
  - Zemmouri El Bahri
  - Zenina

== Summits ==
Several mountain peaks are found in this mountain range:

- Bouzegza Mountain (1032 m)
- Djerrah Mount (740 m)
- Ighil Zenabir Mount (630 m)
- Ben Norah Mount (467 m)
- Sidi Fredj Mount (452 m)
- Bouarous Mount (444 m)
- Soumâa Mount (430 m)
- Bouzareah Mountain (410m)

== Forests ==
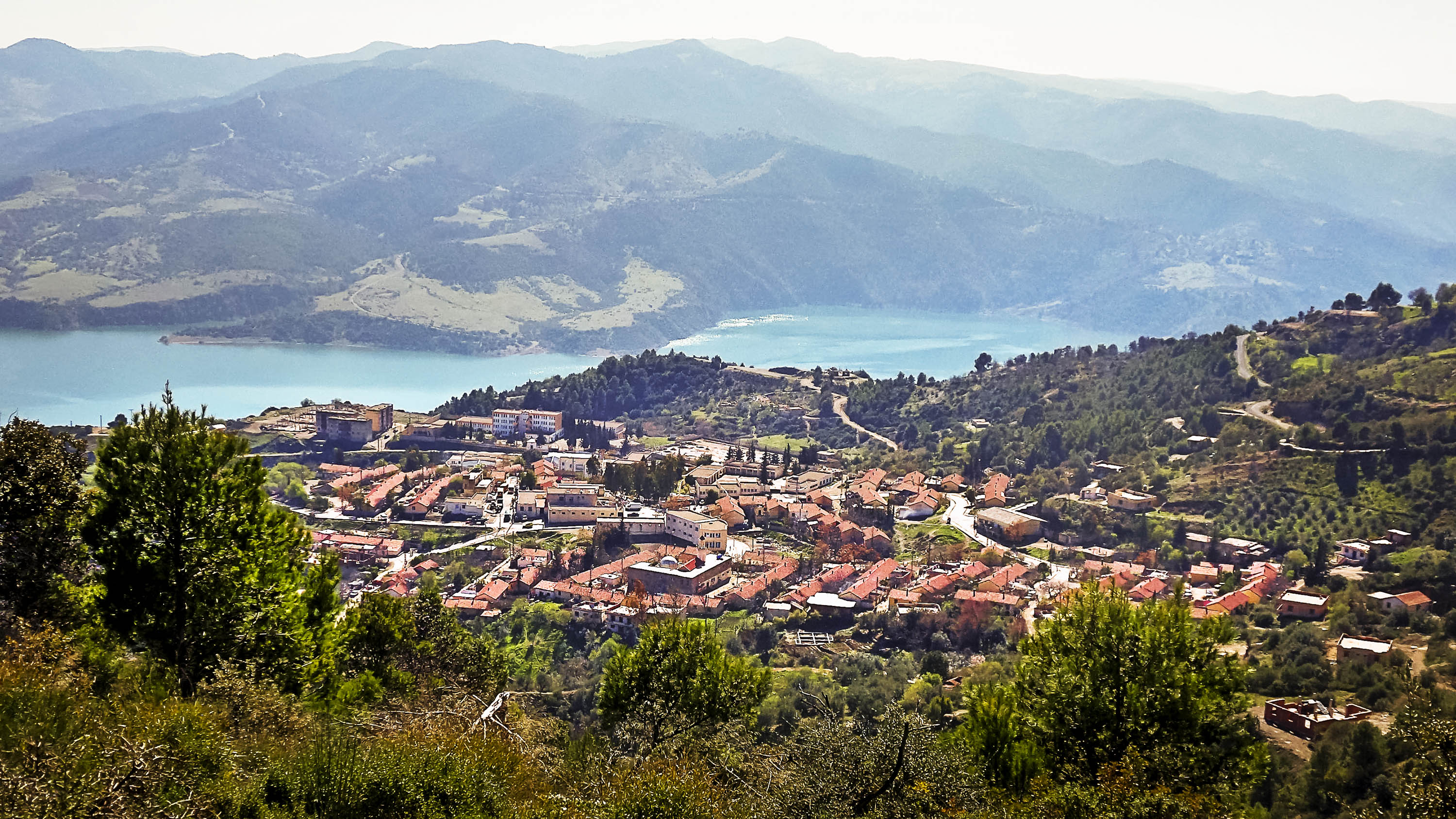
Zbarbar Forest

The plant cover in this mountain range shelters several forests including:

- Boukram Forest
- Corso Forest
- Zbarbar Forest
- Zemmouri Forest

== Rivers ==
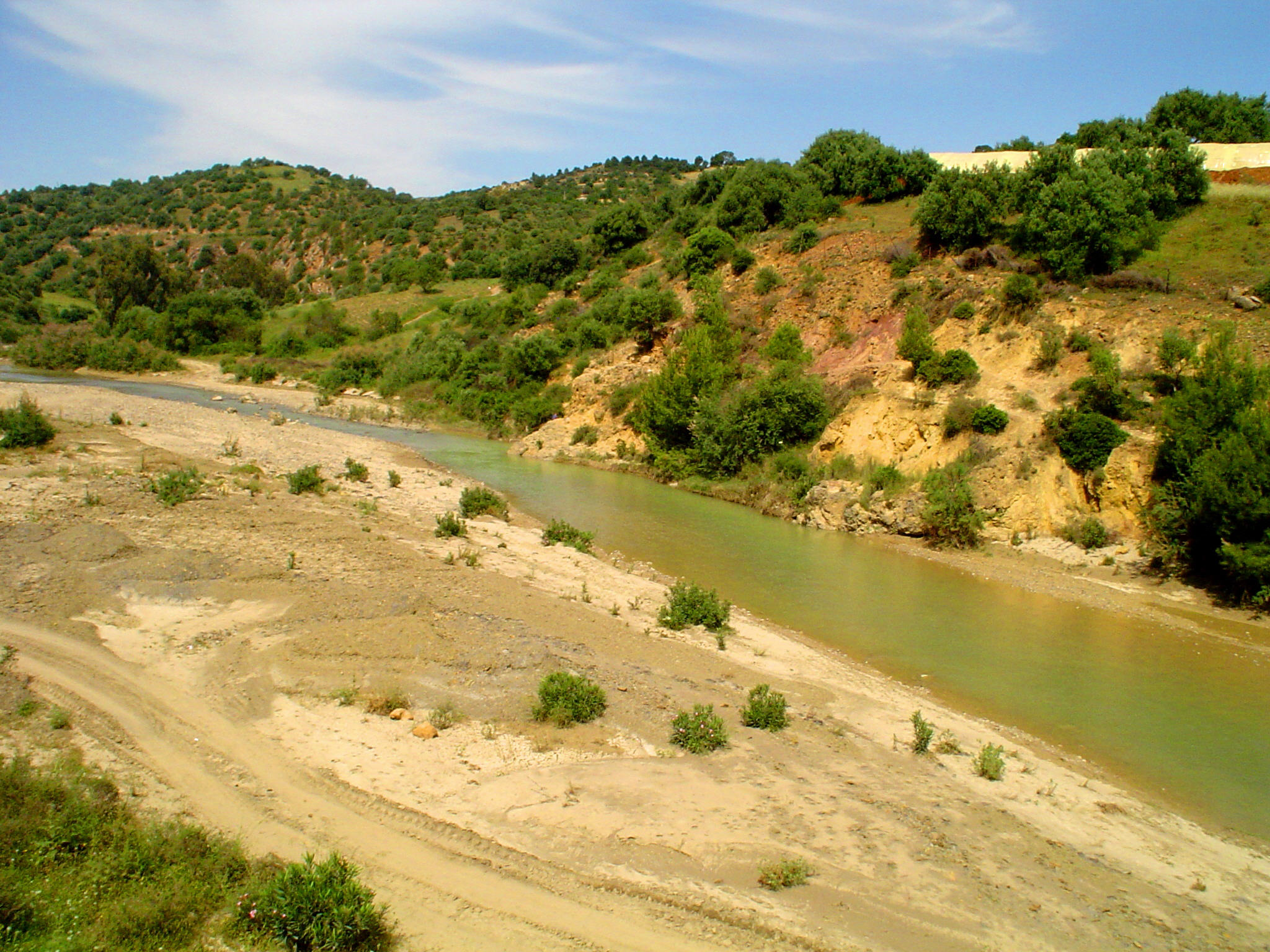
Isser River

This mountain range is crossed by dozens of rivers:

- Arbia River
- Boudouaou River
- Oued Boumerdès
- Oued Corso
- Hamiz River
- Isser River
- Keddache River
- Meraldene River

== Dams ==
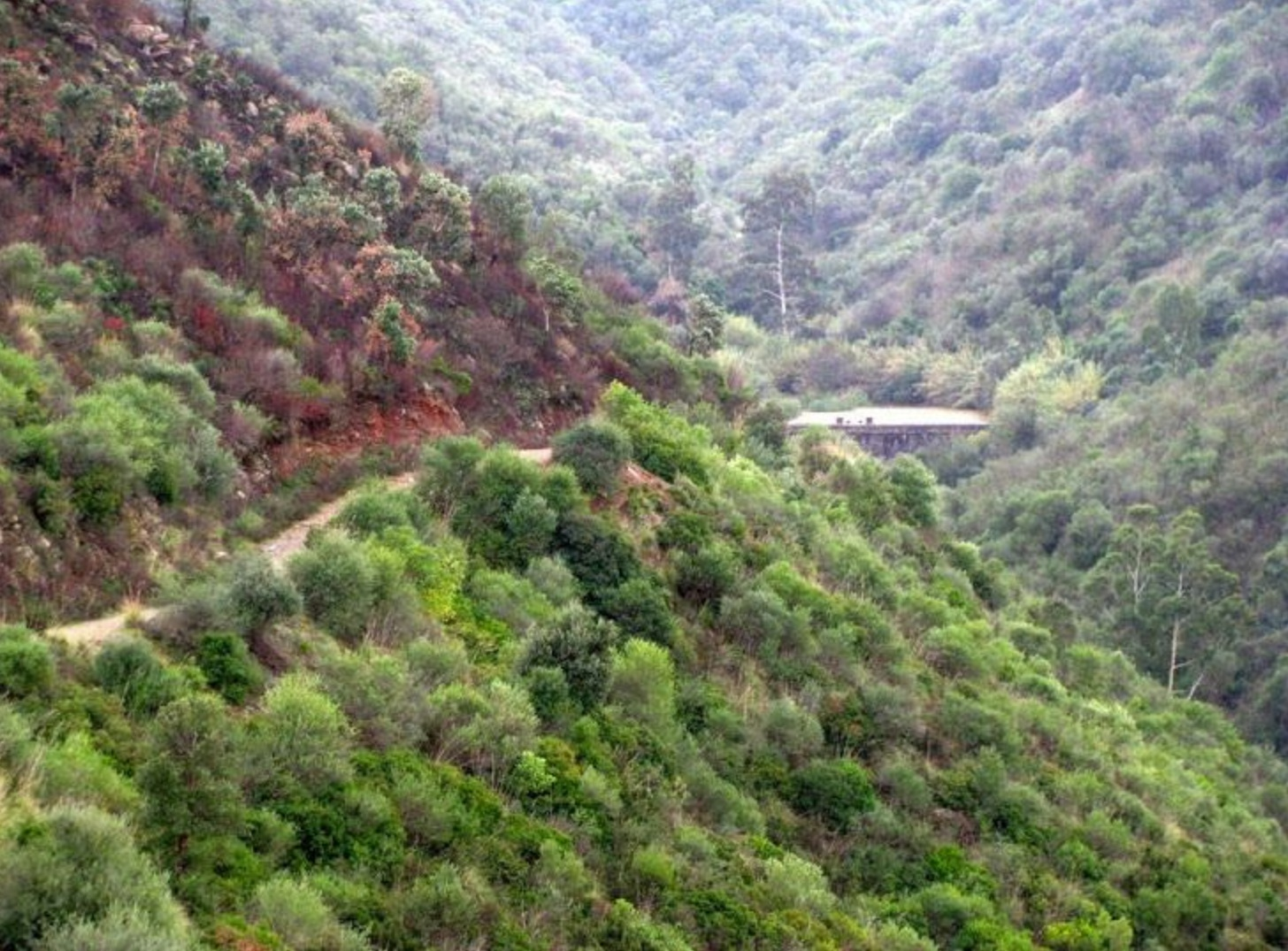
Meraldene River

Several hydraulic dams have been built on the waterways of this mountain range:

- Keddara Dam
- Meraldene Dam
- Beni Amrane Dam
- Hamiz Dam

== Gallery ==
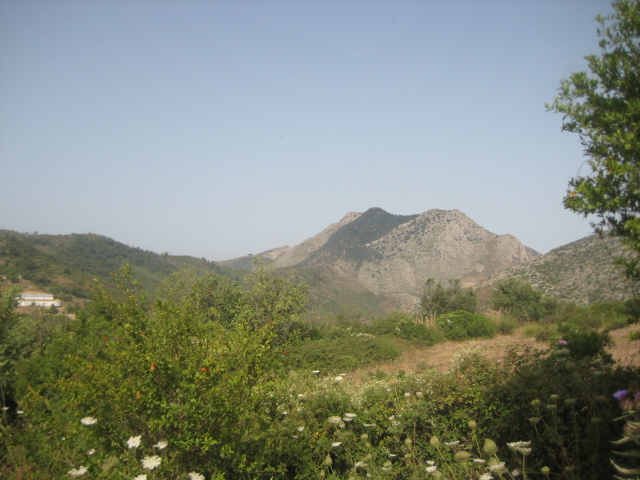
Bouzegza Mountain

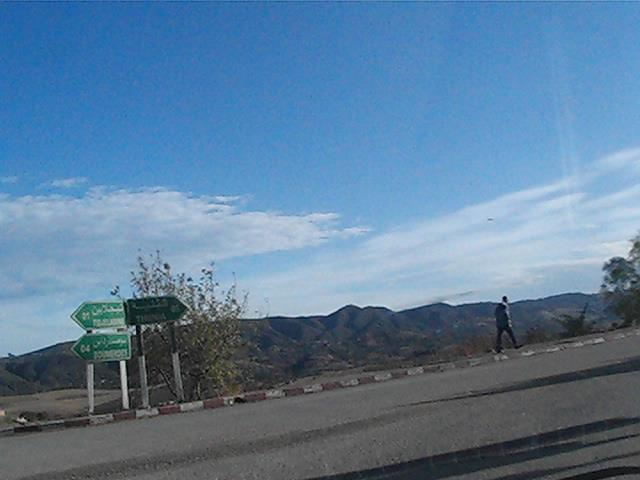
Bouarous Mount

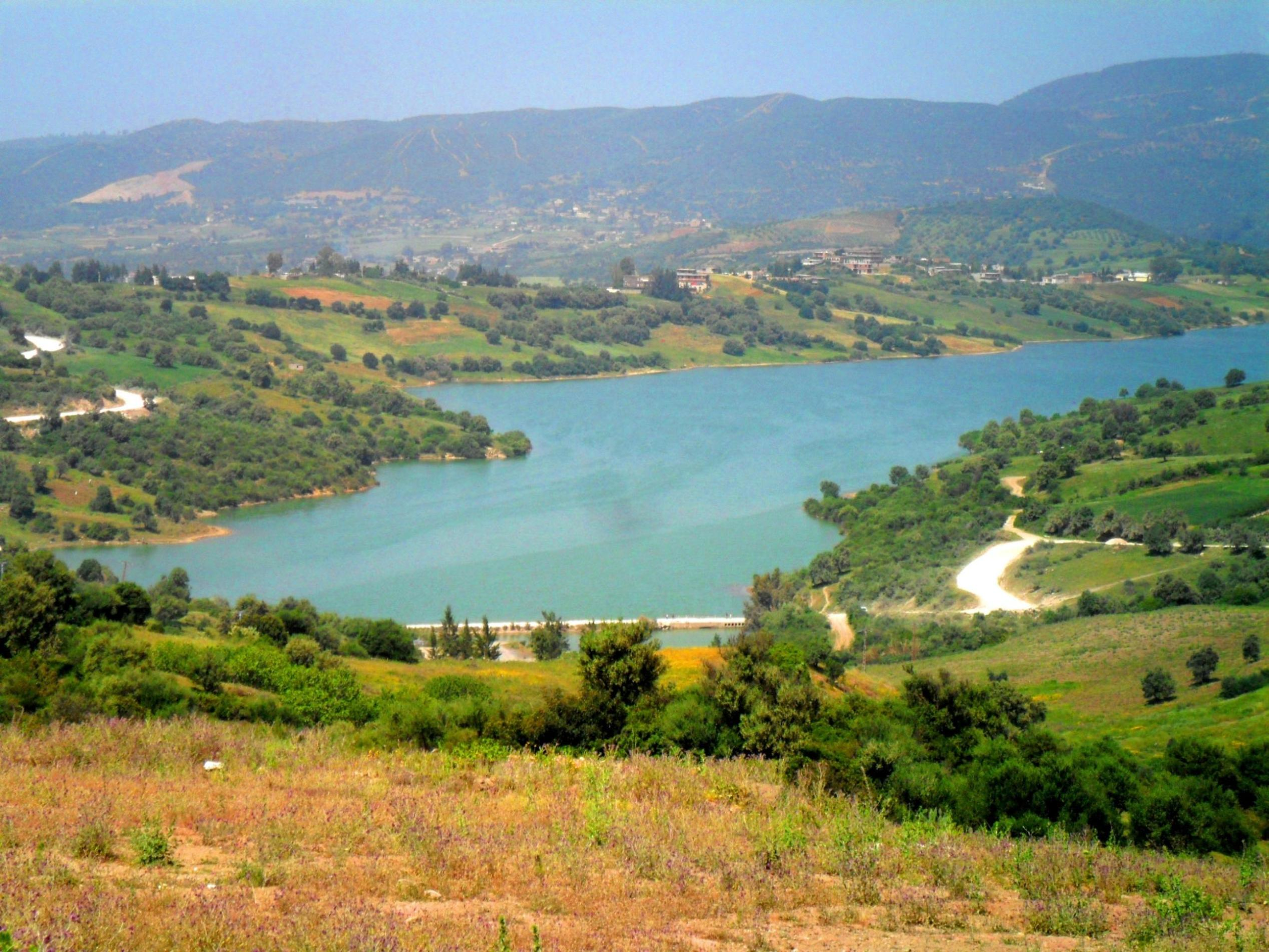
Keddara Dam

== See also ==
- Kabyles
- Al-arbaâ Valley
- List of mountains in Algeria
- Tell Atlas
- Reghaïa Valley
- Corso Valley
- Boudouaou Valley
- Boumerdès Valley
- Arabeya Valley
