= Deriche =

Deriche (Arabic: دريش; Berber languages: ⴷⴻⵔⵉⵛⴻ) is a surname. Notable people with the name include:

- Mohamed Deriche (1865-1948), Algerian politician
- Lyès Deriche (1932-1982), Algerian politician
- Rachid Deriche (1954-), Algerian scientist
- Dahmane Deriche (politician), Algerian politician
- Dahmane Deriche, Algerian artist
- Mohamed Deriche (scientist), Algerian scientist
- Deriche edge detector, digital image operator
- Deriche company of synthetic grass, Algerian company
