= Souk El Had (disambiguation) =

Souk El Had, Boumerdès is a commune in Boumerdès Province within Algeria.

It may also refer to:

- Souk El Had, Relizane, a commune in Relizane Province within Algeria.
- 2007 Souk El Had bombing, a terrorist attack in Algeria.
