= Bourlon de Lixières =

French officer

- Born: Pierre-François de Bourlon d'Oriancourt de Lixières; 19 August 1788; Belleau, Kingdom of France
- Died: Unknown; Kingdom of France
- Military career
- Allegiance: France
- Branch: French Army
- Rank: Lieutenant colonel
- Conflicts: French conquest of Algeria: Expedition of the Col des Beni Aïcha (1837); First Battle of Boudouaou (1837); First Battle of the Issers (1837)
- Awards: Legion of Honour

Pierre-François de Bourlon d'Oriancourt de Lixières (born in Belleau on 19 August 1788) was a French officer who participated to the French conquest of Algeria.

== Family ==
Pierre-François de Bourlon was born on 19 August 1788 in the town of Belleau in the department of Meurthe-et-Moselle within France.

== Military career ==
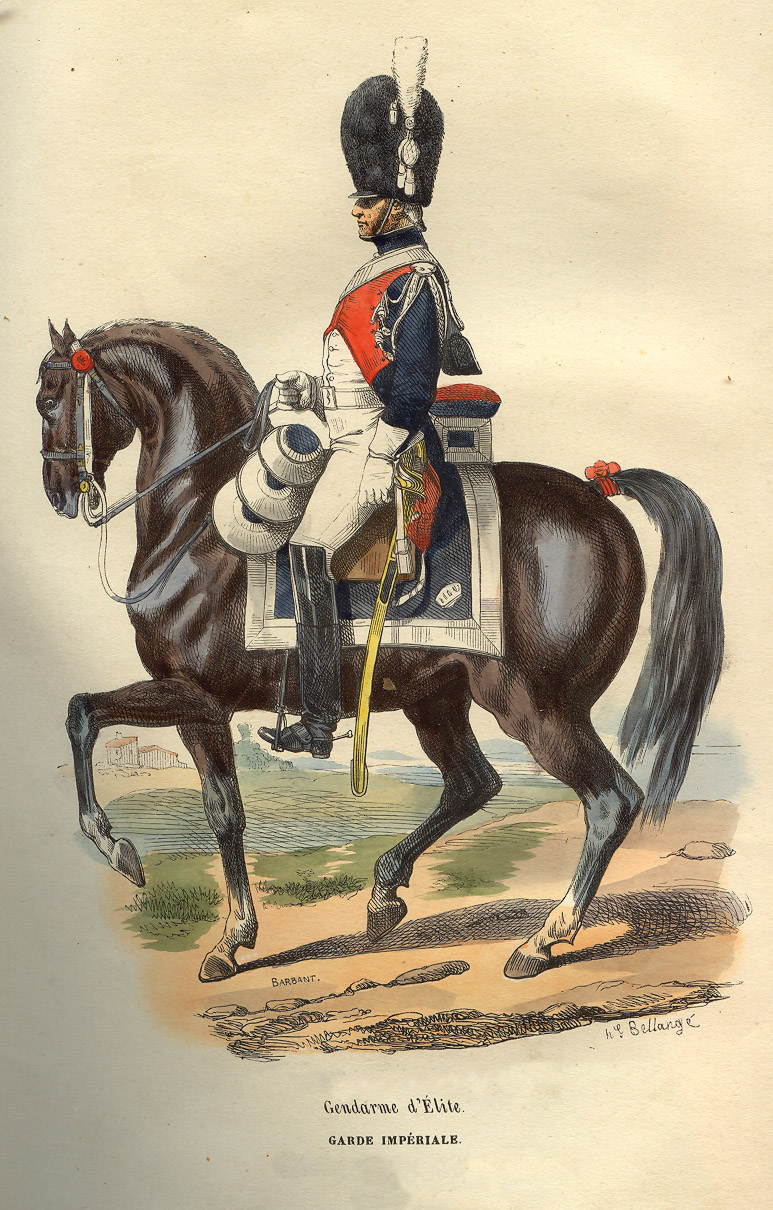
A Gendarme d'élite de la Garde Impériale

He initially enlisted in the body of the French National Gendarmerie from the date of 15 April 1807 as an orderly gendarme.

He then obtained a military promotion to the rank of second lieutenant on 19 May 1808, then to the rank of lieutenant on 8 February 1811.

He was then promoted to the rank of captain on 12 June 1813, then to the rank of battalion commander on 21 August 1823.

He then acceded as a bonus for him to the status of military officer on 21 March 1831.

His final and highest rank was obtained as lieutenant colonel on 31 December 1835, and he was then in service in Algeria.

== French conquest of Algeria ==
Lieutenant colonel Bourlon de Lixières participated in the French conquest of Algeria in the First Battle of Boudouaou dated 25 May 1837.

Indeed, Colonel Maximilien Joseph Schauenburg's mobile military column had returned from the Expedition of the Col des Beni Aïcha on 19 May 1837 to the Boudouaou camp where it found Captain Antoine de La Torré, and the soldiers found the convoy of food and ammunition led by Colonel Bourlon de Lixières who commanded the 63rd line infantry regiment.

After the French victory of 26 May 1837 in Boudouaou materialized, the governor of Algiers Charles-Marie Denys de Damrémont successively recalled Colonel Schauenburg and then Lieutenant colonel Lixières in Algiers since it was no longer necessary to maintain a large military force in Boudouaou, and a modest detachment was enough to maintain order there.

But the counter-offensive against Kabylia was decided in Algiers, and Lieutenant-Colonel de Lixières participated again with the infantry regiment of Colonel Schauenbourg's column in the First Battle of the Issers from 27 May 1837, and he marched on the left bank of Oued Isser, conforming his movements to those of General Alexandre Charles Perrégaux's troops.

== Retreat ==
After having participated in the suffocation of the insurrection of Kabylia after the First Raid on Reghaïa, he was then admitted to military retirement as lieutenant colonel on 24 March 1838.

== Awards ==
Bourlon de Lixières was decorated with several medals during his military career, including:

- Officer of the Legion of Honour, decorated with this medal dated 17 September 1814.
- Great Officer of the Legion of Honour, decorated with this medal dated 21 March 1831.

== See also ==
- French conquest of Algeria
- Expedition of the Col des Beni Aïcha (1837)
- First Battle of Boudouaou (1837)
- First Battle of the Issers (1837)
