= Souk El-Had =

Coordinates: 36.6909°N 3.5889°E

- Commune and town
- Interactive map of Souk El-Had
- Country: Algeria
- Province: Boumerdès Province

Population (1998)
  - Total: 4,860
- Time zone: UTC+1 (CET)

Souk El-Had is a town and commune in Boumerdès Province, Algeria. According to the 1998 census it has a population of 4,860.

== Villages ==
The villages of the commune of Souk El-Had are:

- A
  - Aït Ali
  - Aït Amar
  - Aït Hamadouche
- D
  - Djenah
- F
  - Fekhara
- G
  - Gueraïchene
- I
  - Imedjkanene
  - Itoubal
- T
  - Titouna

== History ==
=== French conquest ===
- Expedition of the Col des Beni Aïcha (1837)
- First Battle of the Issers (1837)

=== Algerian Revolution ===
- Ferme Gauthier

=== Salafist terrorism ===
- 2007 Souk El Had bombing (11 February 2007)

== Rivers ==
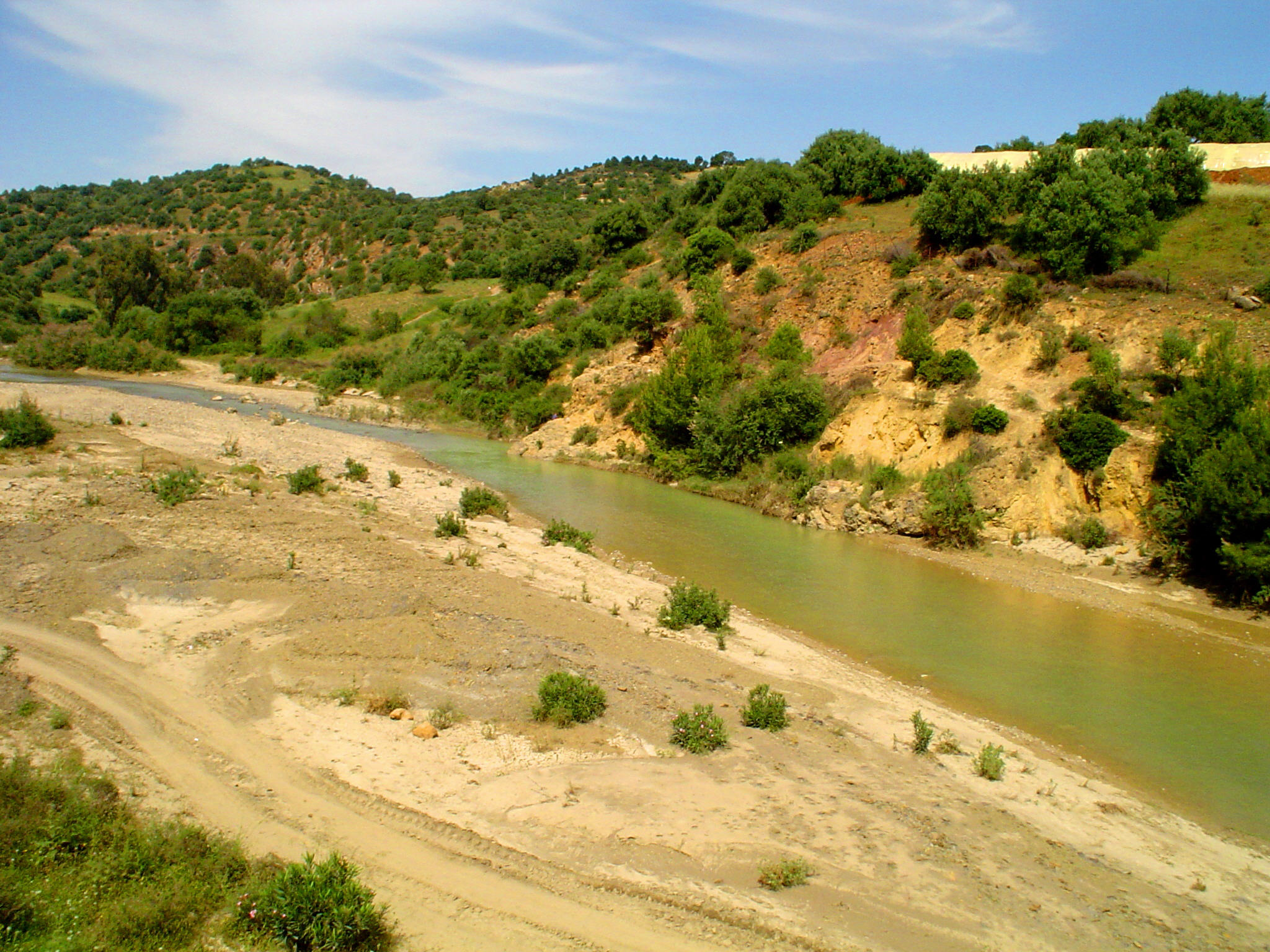
Isser River

This commune is crossed by several rivers:

- Isser River
- Arbia River

== Football clubs ==
Club	Division	Level	Location	Logo
O Souk El Had	Ligue de Football de la Wilaya	3	Souk El-Had	
IRB Souk El Had	Ligue de Football de la Wilaya	3	Souk El-Had	

== Notable people ==
- Mohamed Deriche, 20th-century leader of the Kabyle political resistance against the French.
- Lyès Deriche, 20th-century leader of the Algerian national political movement against the French.
