= Lixières =

Lixières is a surname. Notable people with the surname include:

- Bourlon de Lixières (1788 – after 1838), French officer

== See also ==
- Fléville-Lixières, a town in France
