= Mohamed Deriche =

Algerian Berber politician

Mohamed Deriche Arabic: محمد دريش Berber languages: ⵎⵓⵀⴰⵎⴻⴷ ⴷⴻⵔⵉⵛⵀⴻ
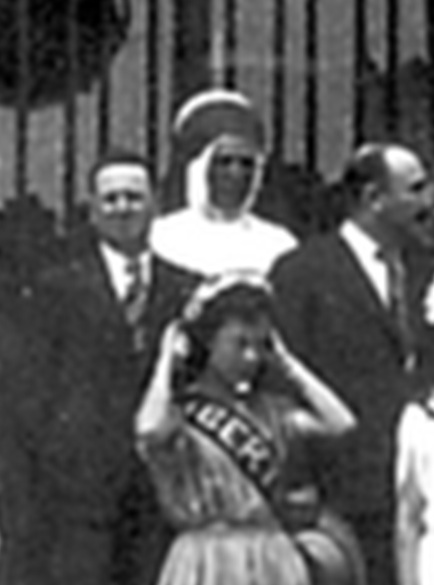
- Bachagha Mohamed Deriche

Bachagha of Khachna
- In office 1938–1946

Qaid of Khachna
- In office 1919–1938

Personal details
- Born: 1865 Souk El-Had, Algiers department, Kabylie, Algeria.
- Died: 1948 (aged 82–83) Boudouaou, Algiers department, Kabylie, Algeria.

Mohamed Deriche (Arabic: محمد دريش, Berber languages: ⵎⵓⵃⵎⵎⴰⴷ ⴷⴻⵔⵉⵛⴻ), (born 1865 in Souk El-Had, Boumerdès Province, Kabylie, Algeria; died 1948 in Boudouaou, Algeria) was an Algerian Berber politician after the French conquest of Algeria.

== Presentation ==
Mohamed Deriche was born in the Kabyle douar of Aïth Hamadouche in 1865.

The Aïth Hamadouche are a Berber tribe of Kabylia whose village is located on the eastern part of the Khachna mountain range and overlooks Oued Isser.

His father was Ali Deriche, a farmer in Beni Amrane, and his grandfather was Mohamed Deriche, former Zouave.

Mohamed was a native of the Khachna region, which is part of Lower Kabylia, which stretches from Oued Sebaou to Oued Mazafran.

The surname Deriche was attributed to the Mohamed family by the fr during the establishment of the Indigenous civil state of Algeria at the time of the governor Louis Tirman.

This name Deriche is either a modification of the Arabic name Dervish, or a meaning of French opulence "De Riche".

== Caïdat ==
Mohamed Deriche was appointed in the caïdat from 1919 until his retirement in 1946.

He was thus a Qaid of the Khachna who was a part of the Menerville district.

Qaid Mohamed Deriche was a member of the municipal council of Ménerville and was assisted by an indigenous council of municipal councilors whose members were Rabah Maref, Dahmane Deriche, Rabah Timizar, Hocine Fazez, Mohamed Amraoui, Lounès Deriche and Ahmed Deriche.

This Qaid attended the administrative, electoral and festive meetings which took place at the level of the town hall of Ménerville in 1931 and 1932.

Mohamed Deriche had to collaborate with the mayors César Boniface and Jérôme Zévaco.

== Activities ==
The Qaid Mohamed Deriche watched peace and serenity in the douars of Khachna.

Mohamed Deriche and Sheikh Mohamed Seghir Boushaki, under the guardianship of the Clerk of the Peace of the Ménerville court, were helped by French agents and were able to elucidate many harassments and misdemeanors.

== Properties ==
Mohamed Deriche has One of these properties located in Beni Amrane was specialized in cattle breeding (French: élevage bovin) where the crossing of bulls and heifers aimed at the improvement of animal breeds. This farm of Beni Amrane received the Medal of Honor of the work several times. The vermeil medal was awarded in 1913 to the father of Mohamed Deriche who counted more than 30 years of agricultural services since 1880.

== Nationalist Movement ==
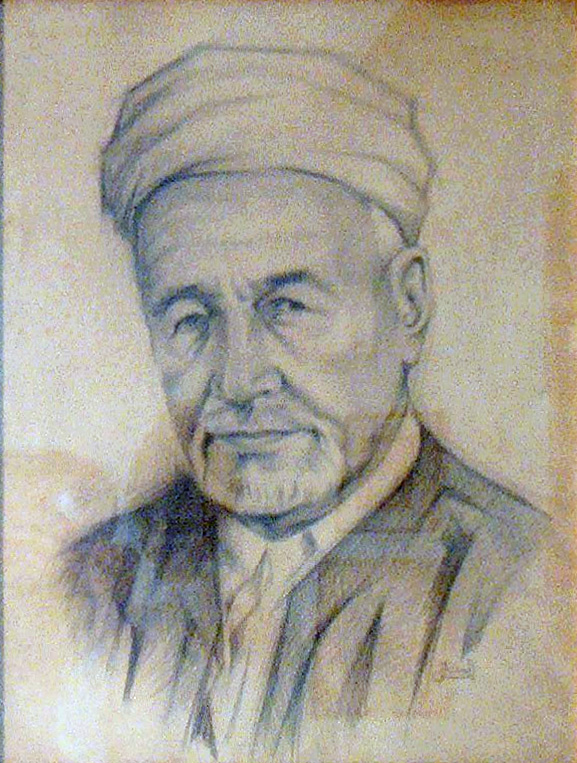
Mohamed Bachir El Ibrahimi

Due to his political position, Mohamed Deriche had a privileged relationship with the Algerian Muslim Ulemas Association since its creation in 1931.

He received Mohamed Bachir El Ibrahimi at his home in Ménerville and accompanied him to the Zawiya of Aïth Hamadouche in the heights of Souk El-Had in the pass of Aïth Aïcha to receive the reforming councils in religion and politics. The Imam khatib who preached this Zawiya was Mohamed Boushaki (1876–1950), whose uncle Mohamed Seghir Boushaki (1869–1959) was Sheikh El Ferka of the Aïth Aïcha and a municipal councilor of the town hall of Ménerville.

== Algerian War ==
Lyès Deriche, who housed in his villa in the Algerian commune of Clos-Salembier the meeting of the Group of 22 baptized Revolutionary Committee of Unity and Action (RCUA). is related to him .

On 25 July 1954, in the modest villa belonging to Elias Deriche, twenty-two Algerians spoke for the unlimited revolution until total independence. They were all elders of the Special Organization who were summoned in the second half of June 1954.

Many of them were from families where there were qaids and bachaghas who had studied in the schools of the Association Of Algerian Muslim scholars.

Elias Deriche, a friend of Zoubir Bouadjadj, was a former militant of the Movement for the Triumph of Democratic Liberties who exploited the notoriety of his family to weave a clandestine revolutionary network in Lower Kabylia. He welcomed Mohamed Boudiaf who was the revolutionary leader of Algiers, and had prepared the meal for the participants in the historic meeting.

About noon the owner of the house, Deriche, invited the presents to a couscous, and after a short pause they returned to work.

== Independent Algeria ==
The son of Mohamed Deriche, Dahmane Deriche, was appointed to represent the former commune of Souk El-Had in the special delegation responsible for the new commune of Ménerville after the proclamation of Algerian independence in 1962.

Dahman previously ran a farm in Souk El-Had and maintained an intimate relationship with the Algerian National Movement.

It was by the decree of 21 August 1962, published in the Official Journal of the Algerian Democratic and Popular Republic that the prefect of Algiers Nadir Kassab appointed Dahmane Deriche to this administrative post.

Dahmane will be political commissar of the FLN for the post-colonial period in Lower Kabylia.

== See also ==
- Algerian nationalism
- Algerian National Movement
- French Third Republic
- French Fourth Republic
- History of Algeria
- List of Algerians
- Cheikh Mokrani
