= Ben Daoud, Boumerdès =

Village in the Boumerdès Province in Kabylie, Algeria

Coordinates: 36.7167593°N 3.5281517°E

Ben Daoud is a village in the Boumerdès Province in Kabylie, Algeria.

== Location ==
The village is surrounded by Meraldene and the town of Thenia in the Khachna mountain range.
