= Mohamed Mechkarini =

Kabyle rebel

- Born: Mohamed Mechkarini; 1896; Thénia, French Algeria (now Algeria)
- Died: 1935 (aged 38–39); Algiers, French Algeria (now Algeria)
- Cause of death: Summary execution
- Resting place: Algiers, Algeria
- Known for: Algerian nationalism
- Movement: Algerian nationalism

Mohamed Mechkarini (1896–1935) is a Kabyle rebel who attacked colonial administrators in the early twentieth century. Finally captured, he was arrested on January 6, 1929.

== Desertion ==
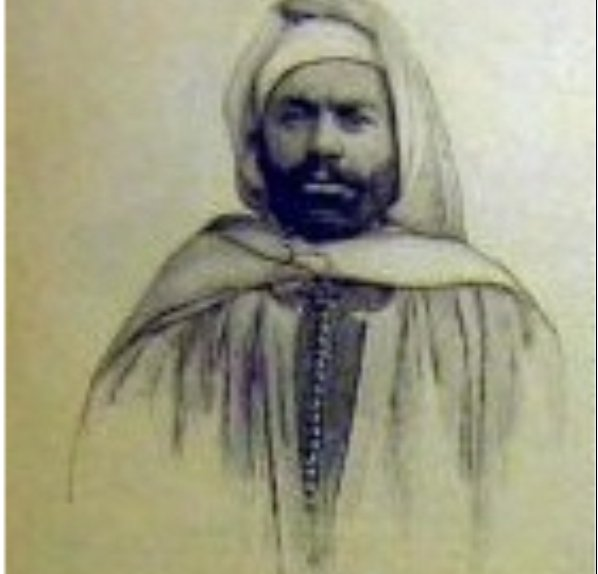
Arezki El Bachir

On October 17, 1915, in time of World War I, the rifleman Mohamed Mechkarini, of the 1st regiment of the Algerian riflemen, then in garrison with Miliana, left his body carrying some military effects.

Mohamed Mechkarini had joined a group of Algerian soldiers in the garrison of Miliana, with his friend Zemmouri Ben Kada, to operate a massive desertion of the ranks of the French army to begin the preparation for a rebellion independence in Algeria.

Mechkarini followed in his journey the epic of the resistants Mohand Saïd Abdoun and Arezki El Bachir.

Volunteered in 1914, his colleague Zemmouri Ben Kada, after the regulatory instruction, was directed in France on the front, and on May 24, 1915, being sentinel to one of the listening posts, his company, the 10th, being on duty, he passed to the enemy, carrying his weapons with one of his comrades named Sellaf.

These facts soon became known to the Regiment depot at Miliana, where it was noted.

Mohamed Mechkarini, having learned of the desertion of his friend Zemmouri, he prepared for five months his departure from the barrenison before performing his action on October 17, 1915.

Having been taken prisoner in Germany, Zemmouri soon suffered the effects of the propaganda which was made in the native prison camps for the recruitment of the Turkish army, and consented to serve in the enemy ranks.

However, Zemmouri returned to his depot at Miliana on January 25, 1920, and was demobilized on March 4, without being disturbed.

Shortly after his liberation, Zemmouri, probably believing that everything was forgotten, had the unfortunate idea to give sign of life.

He came to the depot of his former regiment to demand a payback, arguing that his former prisoner and wounded.

Searches were made and notes about him reappeared. Zemmouri was arrested and prosecuted.

He confessed to the facts after initially indicating that he had been injured during a patrol and taken prisoner.

The war council of Algiers, presided over by Colonel Nicolas Delin, colonel of the gendarmerie, ruled on February 1, 1921 this tirailleur of the 9th regiment of Algerian riflemen, garrisoned Miliana, named Zemmouri Ben Kada, charged with desertion to the enemy.

At the hearing, at the end of the trial, the accused made inappropriate assessments of the skirmisher regiments.

Zemmouri was tried according to the Code of Military Justice for the Army, following articles 235 to 239 relating to desertion abroad and desertion to the enemy.

The Algiers Military Council sentenced him to death.

During the meeting, Captain Boutet was the government commissioner, while the defense of Zemmouri was provided by the lawyer Emile Morinaud.

== Arrest ==
After rolling his hump everywhere, Mohamed Mechkarini was arrested January 6, 1929 by the gendarmerie of Thénia.

== Judicial process ==
The military tribunal of Algiers, under the presidency of Councilor Collin, had judged the case of Mohamed Mechkarini for his desertion in time of war.

He was tried according to the Code of Military Justice for the Army, following articles 231 to 234 on desertion within the country.

In court, Mechkarini says he deserted not for fear of fighting, but as a result of ill-treatment of one of his sergeants.

This statement is recognized as erroneous, and the deserter is sentenced to three years in prison.

His defense was provided by the lawyer Naudin.

== See also ==
- Arezki El Bachir
