= Skhirat, Boumerdès =

Skhirat
- Nickname: Sghirat
- Motto: الصخيرات - الصغيرات
- Interactive map of Skhirat
- Coordinates: 36.7825743°N 3.5230245°E
- Commune: Thénia
- District: Thénia District
- Province: Boumerdès Province
- Region: Kabylie
- Country: Algeria Algeria

Area
  - Total: 4 km^{2} (1.5 sq mi)

Dimensions
  - Length: 2 km (1.2 mi)
  - Width: 2 km (1.2 mi)
- Elevation: 32 m (105 ft)
- Time zone: UTC+01:00
- Area code: 35005
- Website: thenia.net

Skhirat or Sghirat is a village in the Boumerdès Province in Kabylie, Algeria.

== Location ==
The village is surrounded by Keddache River and the towns of Thenia and Zemmouri in the Khachna mountain range.

== History ==
This village has experienced the facts of several historical events:

- Expedition of the Col des Beni Aïcha (1837)
- Battle of the Col des Beni Aïcha (1871)
