= Ouled Salah, Boumerdès =

Coordinates: 36.7167593°N 3.5281517°E

Ouled Salah is a village in the Boumerdès Province in Kabylie, Algeria.

== Location ==
The village is surrounded by Meraldene and the town of Thenia in the Khachna mountain range.
