= Louz, Boumerdès =

Coordinates: 36.7266403°N 3.5252723°E

Louz is a village in the Boumerdès Province in Kabylie, Algeria.

== Location ==
The village is surrounded by Meraldene and the town of Thenia in the Khachna mountain range.
