= Aït Ali =

Aït Ali Si Embarek
- Motto: آيت علي سي أمبارك
- Interactive map of Aït Ali Si Embarek
- Commune: Souk El-Had
- District: Thénia District
- Province: Boumerdès Province
- Region: Kabylie
- Country: Algeria Algeria

Area
  - Total: 4.4 km^{2} (1.7 sq mi)

Dimensions
  - Length: 2 km (1.2 mi)
  - Width: 2.2 km (1.4 mi)
- Elevation: 460 m (1,510 ft)
- Time zone: UTC+01:00
- Area code: 35020

Aït Ali Si Embarek is a village in the Boumerdès Province in Kabylie, Algeria.

== Location ==
The village is surrounded by Isser River and Meraldene River and the towns of Souk El-Had, Thénia and Beni Amrane in the Khachna mountain range.
