= Alexandre Charles Perrégaux =

French soldier and officer

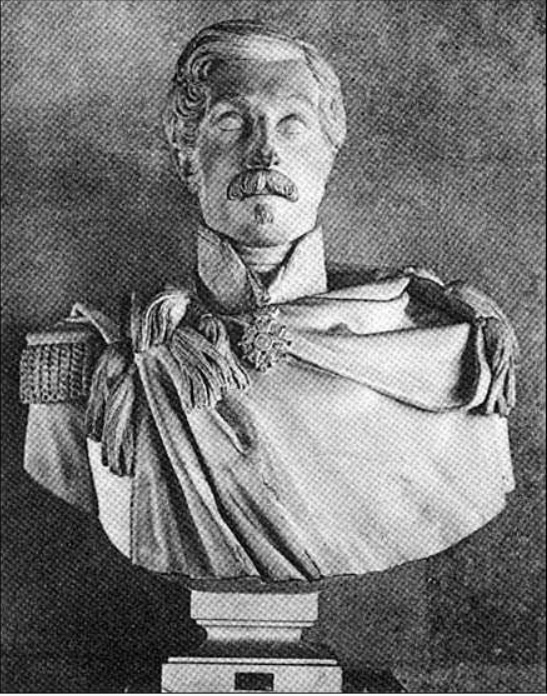
- Born: Alexandre Charles Perrégaux; 21 October 1791; Neuchâtel, Principality of Neuchâtel
- Died: 6 November 1837 (aged 46); Mediterranean Sea
- Burial place: Cagliari, Italy
- Spouse: Cécile de Pourtalès (death 1830)
- Military career
- Allegiance: France
- Branch: French Army
- Service years: 1817–1837
- Rank: Maréchal de camp
- Conflicts: French conquest of Algeria: Expedition of the Col des Beni Aïcha (1837); First Battle of Boudouaou (1837); Siege of Constantine (1837)
- Awards: Legion of Honour

Alexandre Charles Perrégaux (21 October 1791 – 6 November 1837) was a French Army officer who participated in the French conquest of Algeria.

== Family ==
Alexandre Charles Perrégaux was born on 21 October 1791 in Neuchâtel, Principality of Neuchâtel, the second son of Charles Albert Henri Perregaux (1757-1831) who was state councilor, colonel inspector of militias and knight of the red eagle.

He had married Cécile de Pourtalès in Neuchâtel on 5 December 1825. Cécile, who was born on 9 September 1804, predeceased her husband, dying in Paris on 24 March 1830. The couple had no surviving children.

== Injury and death ==
Perrégaux took part in the Expedition of the Col des Beni Aïcha, and was present at the Siege of Constantine on 12 October 1837 when General Charles-Marie Denys de Damrémont was killed by a cannonball. While attempting to reach Damrémont and recover his body, Perrégaux was struck by a bullet which passed through his nose and into the palate of his mouth. He was knocked unconscious and wounded on Damrémont's body.

Perregaux was rushed back by his soldiers to the town of Annaba, and embarked on a boat to take him back to France. He died at sea while crossing the Mediterranean.

The boat carrying him docked in a port on the island of Sardinia, and he was buried in a cemetery in the city of Cagliari.

== Bibliography ==
- Valentin Devoisins (1838). Recueil de documents sur l'expédition et la prise de Constantine. Paris: Joseph Corréard, Éditeur. pp. 25–29.
- Frédéric Alexandre Marie Jeanneret (1863). Biographie neuchâteloise, Volume 2. Le Locle: Eugène Courvoisier, Libraire-Éditeur. pp. 186–193.
- Société historique algérienne (1871). Revue africaine. Volume 15. Algiers: Bastide, Libraire-Éditeur. pp. 5–13.
- Narcisse Faucon (1890). Le livre d'or de l'Algérie: histoire politique, militaire, administrative. Paris: Augustin Challamel, Éditeur. p. 449.
- Jules de Cuverville (1899). Armée, marine, colonies, Volume 1. Paris: Éditions des Armées de Terre et de Mer. pp. 193–195.
