= Charles-Louis Pinson de Ménerville =

Charles-Louis Pinson de Ménerville (1808–1876), the first president of the court of appeals in Algiers, was born in Paris on April 8, 1808.

In 1831, just after the French conquest of Algeria, Ménerville was appointed secretary of the health department of the port of Algiers. In 1834, he became a defence lawyer before the tribunal of Algiers. In 1842, he became a judge at Philippeville. In 1844, when the tribunal at Bône was established, he was appointed its head. He was named vice-president of the Algiers tribunal in 1849 and counsellor to the court in 1852. He became a chevalier of Légion d’honneur in 1858, president of the chamber in 1864 and an officer of the order in 1869. He assumed the highest position in the Algerian court system on November 14, 1874, when he became president of the court. He was still in this post when he died suddenly in June 1876.

He produced a three-volume Dictionnaire de la législation algérienne, code annoté et mantiel raisonné des lois, ordonnances, décrets, décisions et arrêtés publiés au « Bulletin officiel des actes du gouvernment ».

In 1873, the town of Thénia was named Ménerville after him. The town retained the name until a few years after independence in 1962, when it reverted to its earlier Arabic name.
