= Antoine de La Torré =

French soldier and officer

- Born: 29 September 1787; Aranga, Spain
- Died: 8 February 1851 (aged 63); Nice, France
- Military career
- Allegiance: France
- Branch: French Army
- Service years: 1813–1845
- Rank: Colonel
- Conflicts: French conquest of Algeria: Expedition of the Col des Beni Aïcha (1837); First Battle of Boudouaou (1837)
- Awards: Legion of Honour; Commander

Antoine de La Torré (29 September 1787 – 8 February 1851) was a Spanish-born French officer who participated in the French conquest of Algeria.

== Early life ==
According to the 1898 memoirs of François Certain de Canrobert, when he served under de La Torré in Algeria in 1842, it was rumoured that de La Torré was an illegitimate son of Manuel Godoy and that his irascibility was because he was educated as whipping boy for the future Ferdinand VII.

Fighting for Spain in the Spanish War of Independence, de La Torré was taken prisoner by the French army after either the Battle of Tudela or the Battle of Ocaña. He then enlisted in the troupes coloniales as an officer in Joseph Napoleon's Regiment.

== French conquest of Algeria ==
De La Torré was put on leave from military rank on 8 October 1830. He was then appointed major in the occupied city of Algiers on 11 May 1831 during the French conquest of Algeria.

De La Torré proved himself during three military campaigns on Algerian soil: the first lasting from 11 June 1831 to 27 October 1834, the second from 10 January 1836 to 25 February 1839, and the third from 12 April 1840 to 21 March 1845.

Each fight against the Algerian resistance fighters presented him a new opportunity to demonstrate military ability on African soil.

== Citations ==
As Commandant during the First Battle of Boudouaou (25–30 May 1837), de La Torré was awarded the General Order of the African Army on 2 June and 22 June 1837.

His name is cited in the Governor-General of Algeria's special report (27 June 1840) and again in the report of the general commanding the province of Oran and in the agenda of the same date (1 December 1840).

== First Battle of Boudouaou ==
The fight of Boudouaou, a notorious strategic battle for the conquest of Kabylia during the French wars in Africa, granted La Torré the opportunity of a promotion.

The Boudouaou victory earned de La Torré the rank of lieutenant-colonel on 3 September 1837 and the colonel of the 13th Light Infantry Regiment on 20 June 1840.

== Awards ==
De La Torré was decorated with the Legion of Honour on 4 October 1823, promoted to French officer on 30 May 1837 after the First Battle of Boudouaou, and then decorated with the title of Commander on 2 October 1842.

Colonel de La Torré was naturalized a French citizen by the ordinance of 21 December 1844; he was then appointed on 26 February 1845 as first class commander in Oran.

== Death ==
After retiring from the French Army on 27 May 1845, Colonel de la Torré died at the age of 64 in the city of Nice on 8 February 1851.

== See also ==
- Battle of Tudela
- Battle of Ocaña
- Joseph Napoleon's Regiment
- French conquest of Algeria
- Expedition of the Col des Beni Aïcha (1837)
- First Battle of Boudouaou (1837)

== Bibliography ==
- Léon Blondel (1838). Nouvel aperçu sur l'Algérie: Trois nécessités en Afrique: conserver, pacifier, coloniser. Paris: Delaunay, Éditeur. pp. 64–65.
- Louis Blanc (1845). Histoire de dix ans, 1830-1840, Volume 5. Brussels: Société belge de librairie. p. 171.
- Edmond Pellissier de Reynaud (1854). Annales algériennes, Volume 2. Paris: Librairie Militaire. p. 177.
- Narcisse Faucon (1890). Le livre d'or de l'Algérie: histoire politique, militaire, administrative. Paris: Augustin Challamel, Éditeur. pp. 540–542.
- Paul Louis Hippolyte Boppe (1899). Les Espagnols a la Grande-Armée. Paris: Berger-Levrault et Cie, Éditeurs. p. 245.
- Germain Bapst (1899). Le Maréchal Canrobert: souvenirs d' un siècle, Volume 1. Paris: Librairie Plon. p. 402.
- Jean-Jacques Jordi (1996). Espagnol en Oranie: histoire d'une migration, 1830-1914. Nice: Éditions Jacques Gandini. pp. 265–266. ISBN 9782906431324.
