= Mahrane =

Coordinates: 36.7198192°N 3.537085°E

Mahrane or Mehrene is a village in the Boumerdès Province in Kabylie, Algeria.

== Location ==
The village is surrounded by Meraldene and the town of Thenia in the Khachna mountain range.
