= Merchicha =

Coordinates: 36.7198192°N 3.5253576°E

Merchicha is a village in the Boumerdès Province in Kabylie, Algeria.

== Location ==
The village is surrounded by Meraldene and the town of Thenia in the Khachna mountain range.

== Notable people ==
- Mohamed Missouri (1947-2015), boxer and coach
