= Draâ Ben Hadhoum =

- Motto: ذراع بن حدهم
- Interactive map of Draâ Ben Hadhoum
- Coordinates: 36.7650852°N 3.5276654°E
- Commune: Thénia
- District: Thénia District
- Province: Boumerdès Province
- Region: Kabylie
- Country: Algeria Algeria

Area
  - Total: 4.4 km^{2} (1.7 sq mi)

Dimensions
  - Length: 2 km (1.2 mi)
  - Width: 2.2 km (1.4 mi)
- Elevation: 320 m (1,050 ft)
- Time zone: UTC+01:00
- Area code: 35005
- Website: thenia.net

Draâ Ben Hadhoum is a village in the Boumerdès Province in Kabylie, Algeria.

== Location ==
The village is surrounded by Keddache River and the towns of Thenia and Zemmouri in the Khachna mountain range.

== History ==
This village has experienced the facts of several historical events:

- Expedition of the Col des Beni Aïcha (1837)
- Battle of the Col des Beni Aïcha (1871)
