= Djenah, Boumerdès =

Village in the Boumerdès Province in Kabylie, Algeria

Coordinates: 36.6959619°N 3.5712846°E

Djenah is a village in the Boumerdès Province in Kabylie, Algeria.

== Location ==
The village is surrounded by Soumâa and the town of Thenia in the Khachna mountain range.

== History ==
This village has experienced the facts of several historical events:

- Expedition of the Col des Beni Aïcha (1837)
- Battle of the Col des Beni Aïcha (1871)
