= Tamsaout, Boumerdès =

Village in the Boumerdès Province in Kabylie, Algeria

Coordinates: 36.7168408°N 3.5550903°E

Tamsaout is a village in the Boumerdès Province in Kabylie, Algeria.

== Location ==
The village is surrounded by Soumâa and the town of Thenia in the Khachna mountain range.
