= Belleau, Meurthe-et-Moselle =

Belleau
- Commune
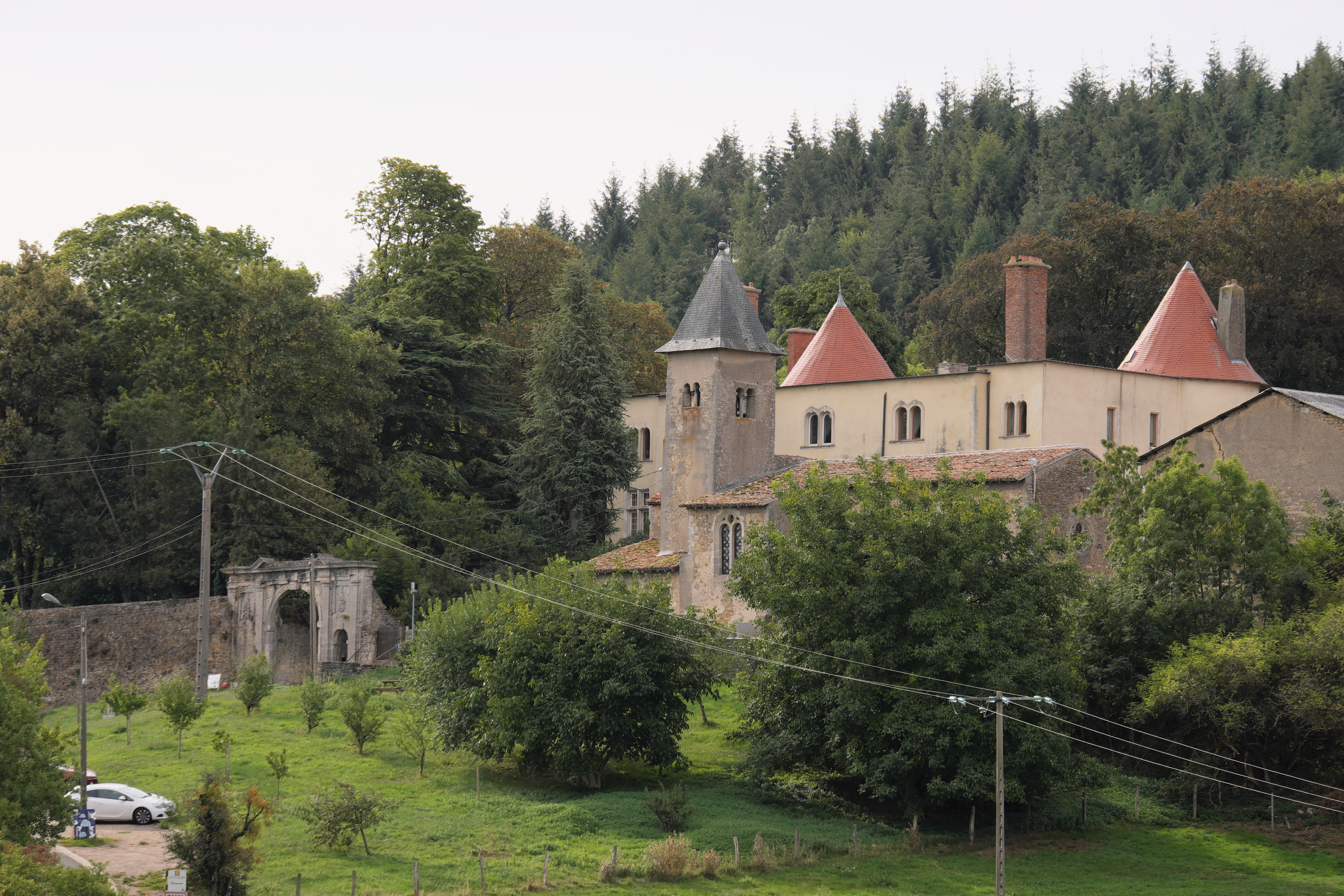
- The chateau and church of Morey

- Coat of arms
- Location of Belleau
- Location within France Location within Grand Est
- Coordinates: 48°49′50″N 6°10′55″E
- Country: France
- Region: Grand Est
- Department: Meurthe-et-Moselle
- Arrondissement: Nancy
- Canton: Entre Seille et Meurthe
- Intercommunality: Seille et Grand Couronné

Government
  - Mayor (2020–2026): Philippe Barthelemy
- Area^{1}: 20.38 km^{2} (7.87 sq mi)
- Elevation: 233 m (764 ft)
- Highest elevation: 397 m (1,302 ft)
- Lowest elevation: 179 m (587 ft)
- Population (2023): 766
  - Density: 37.6/km^{2} (97.3/sq mi)
- Time zone: UTC+01:00 (CET)
  - Summer (DST): UTC+02:00 (CEST)
- INSEE/Postal code: 54059 /54610
- ^{1} French Land Register data, which excludes lakes, ponds, glaciers > 1 km^{2} (0.386 sq mi or 247 acres) and river estuaries.

Belleau (French pronunciation: [bɛlo]) is a commune in the Meurthe-et-Moselle department in northeastern France.

== Population ==
Historical population
Year	Pop.	±% p.a.
1968	612	—
1975	539	−1.80%
1982	621	+2.04%
1990	678	+1.10%
1999	722	+0.70%
2007	745	+0.39%
2012	811	+1.71%
2017	746	−1.66%
2023	766	+0.44%
Source: INSEE

== See also ==
- Communes of the Meurthe-et-Moselle department
