= 2007 Souk El Had bombing =

Terrorist incident in Algeria

Coordinates: 36.6908303°N 3.5913157°E

- Boumerdès Province highlighted within Algeria
- Location: (Algeria) Souk El Had, Boumerdès Province
- Date: February 13, 2007
- Attack type: Car bomb
- Deaths: 8
- Injuries: 50
- Perpetrator: Al-Qaeda Organization in the Islamic Maghreb (suspected)

The 2007 Souk El Had bombing occurred on February 13, 2007, when a car bomb filled with explosives detonated against the headquarters of the Gendarmerie Nationale in the town of Souk El Had, Boumerdès Province, Algeria, destroying buildings, killing 8 and injuring 50. The Al-Qaeda Organization in the Islamic Maghreb was suspected as being responsible.

== See also ==
- Terrorist bombings in Algeria
- List of terrorist incidents, 2007
