= Rachid Deriche =

Algerian-French computer scientist and medical researcher

Rachid Deriche is a research director at Inria Sophia Antipolis, France, where he leads the research project Athena aiming to explore the Central Nervous System using computational imaging. He has published more than 60 journals and more than 180 conferences papers with a Google Scholar H-index of 67. He is known for the development of the edge detection algorithm, named after him.

== Background ==
Deriche was born in 1954, in Thenia, Algeria. He studied electronics at Ecole Nationale Polytechnique of Algiers. In 1977, he moved to France to continue his studies at Ecole Nationale Superieure des Telecommunications of Paris, from which he graduated in 1979. Three years later, he received from University of Paris IX, Dauphine a Ph.D degree in mathematics. He obtained his HDR degree from University of Nice Sophia Antipolis in 1991.

== Contributions ==
Deriche has made major contributions to the scientific community, mainly in image processing, computer vision and neuro-imaging. In 1987, Deriche has developed Deriche Edge Detector which is a low-level, recursively implemented, optimal edge detector based on Canny's edge detector criteria for optimal edge detection. In 1998, based on his works in Computational image processing, Early vision, 3D reconstruction, panoramic photography, image-based modeling, and motion analysis, he co-founded with his Inria colleagues (among which O. Faugeras, T. Papadopoulo and L. Robert), Realviz, a start-up specialized in image-based content creation solutions for the film, broadcast, gaming, digital imaging and architecture. The startup was acquired by Autodesk in 2008. Deriche is currently devoting his research to explore the Central Nervous System by developing mathematical models and tools to reconstruct the functional and anatomical connections network of the brain.

== Awards and honors ==
- ERC Advanced Grant: In 2016, R. Deriche received from the European Research Council (ERC) under the European Union’s Horizon 2020 research and innovation program a grant to support his research project “Computational Brain Connectivity Mapping”.
- Doctorate Honoris Causa: R. Deriche received the title of Honorary Doctor (honoris causa) from the University of Sherbrooke in 2014, to honor his scientific contributions and his approach in educating new generations of scientists
- French Academy of Sciences Grand Prize of the EADS: In 2013, R. Deriche was awarded Grand Prize of the EADS Corporate Foundation in Computer Science by the French Academy of Sciences for all his outstanding scientific contributions in computer science.
