= El Azizia, Médéa =

- Commune and town
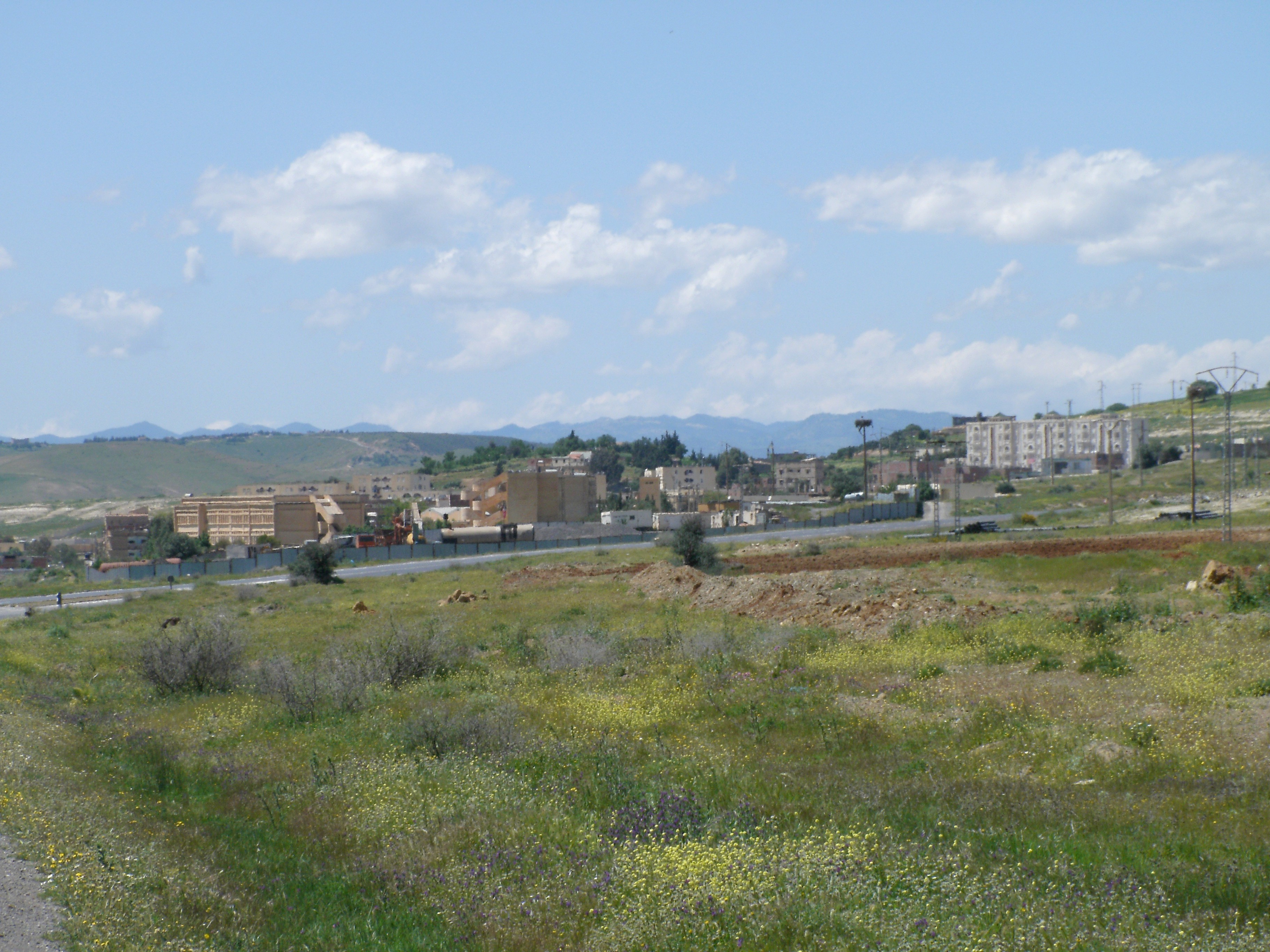

- Location within Algeria
- Coordinates: 36°17′12″N 3°29′39″E
- Country: Algeria
- Province: Médéa Province

Area
  - Total: 16 sq mi (41 km^{2})

Population (2008)
  - Total: 8,432
- Time zone: UTC+1 (CET)

El Azizia (or Azzizia), Médéa is a town and commune in Médéa Province, Algeria. According to the 1998 census, it has a population of 7,905.
