= Beni Arab =

- Motto: بني عراب
- Interactive map of Beni Arab
- Coordinates: 36.7398141°N 3.5257889°E
- Commune: Thénia
- District: Thénia District
- Province: Boumerdès Province
- Region: Kabylie
- Country: Algeria Algeria

Area
  - Total: 4.8 km^{2} (1.9 sq mi)

Dimensions
  - Length: 2 km (1.2 mi)
  - Width: 2.4 km (1.5 mi)
- Elevation: 230 m (750 ft)
- Time zone: UTC+01:00
- Area code: 35005
- Website: thenia.net

Beni Arab is a village in the Boumerdès Province in Kabylie, Algeria.

== Location ==
The village is surrounded by Keddache River and the towns of Thenia and Zemmouri in the Khachna mountain range.

== History ==
This village has experienced the facts of several historical events:

- Expedition of the Col des Beni Aïcha (1837)
- Battle of the Col des Beni Aïcha (1871)
