= Boukhanfar =

- Motto: بوخنفر
- Interactive map of Boukhanfar
- Coordinates: 36.7640444°N 3.5665676°E
- Commune: Thénia
- District: Thénia District
- Province: Boumerdès Province
- Region: Kabylie
- Country: Algeria Algeria

Area
  - Total: 3.6 km^{2} (1.4 sq mi)

Dimensions
  - Length: 1.8 km (1.1 mi)
  - Width: 2 km (1.2 mi)
- Elevation: 450 m (1,480 ft)
- Time zone: UTC+01:00
- Area code: 35005
- Website: thenia.net

Boukhanfar is a village in the Boumerdès Province in Kabylie, Algeria.

== Location ==
The village is surrounded by Keddache River and the towns of Thenia and Zemmouri in the Khachna mountain range.

== History ==
This village has experienced the facts of several historical events:

- Expedition of the Col des Beni Aïcha (1837)
- Battle of the Col des Beni Aïcha (1871)
