= Augustin Challamel =

French historian (1818–1894)

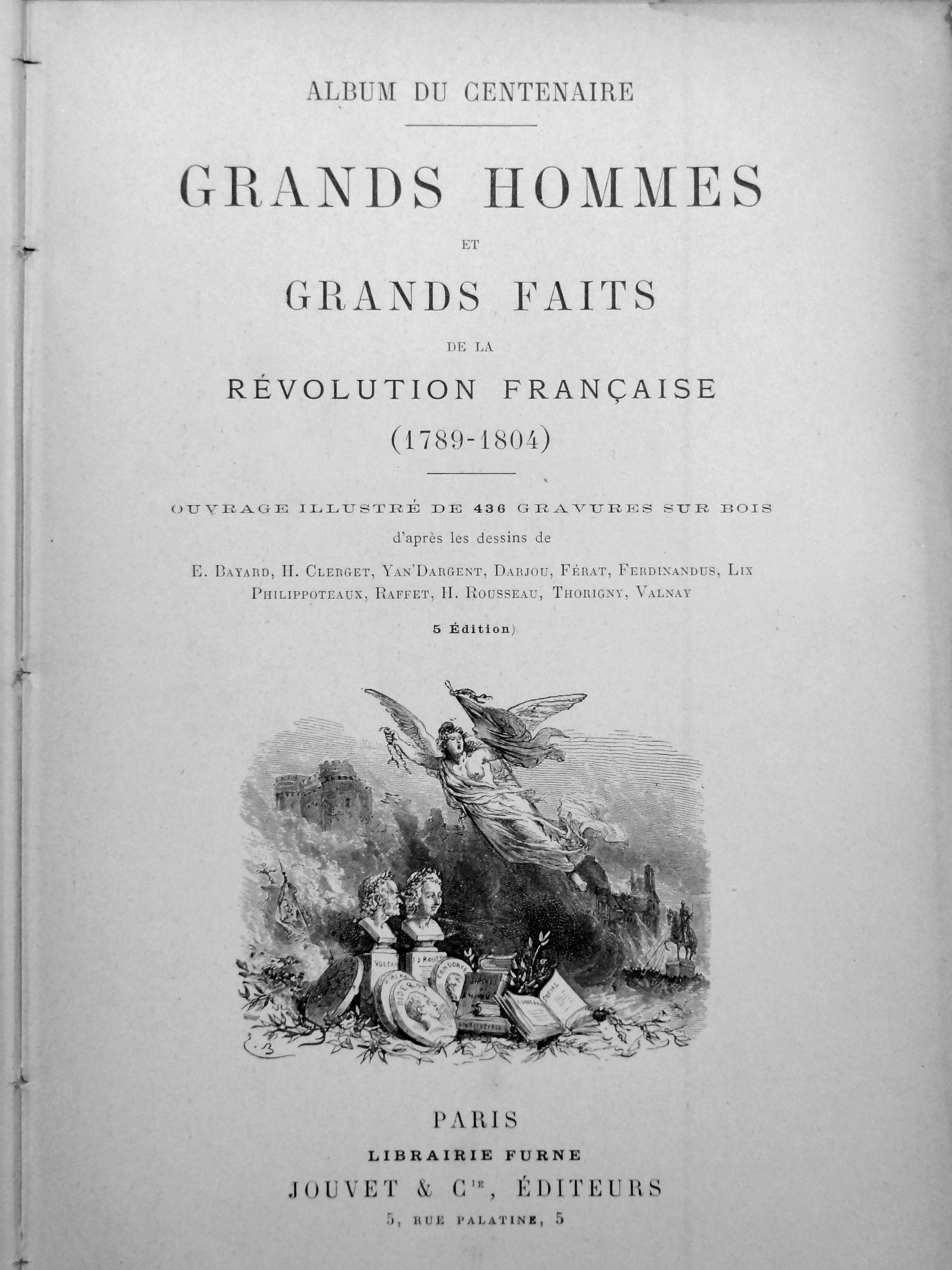
Album du Centenaire. 1889, frontispice

Jean Baptiste Marius Augustin Challamel (March 18, 1818 – October 20, 1894) was a French historian.

Challamel was born in Paris. His writings consist chiefly of popular works, which enjoyed great success. The value of some of his books is enhanced by numerous illustrations, e.g. Histoire-musée de la Révolution française, which appeared in 50 numbers in 1841–1842 (3rd ed., in 72 numbers, 1857–1858); Histoire de la mode en France; la toilette des femmes depuis l'époque gallo-romaine jusqu'à nos jours (1874, with 12 plates; new ed., 1880, with 21 colored plates).

His Mémoires du peuple français (1865–1873) and La France et les Français à travers les siècles (1882) were among the first books written on the social history of France. In this sense Challamel, while not very original, was a pioneer of fairly wide information. He died on October 20, 1894.

== Bibliography ==
- 1839 Les plus jolies tableaux de Teniers, etc..
- 1840 Album du salon de 1840.
- 1841 Les Merveilles de la France.
- 1841-1842 Histoire-Musée de la République française depuis l'Assemblée des notables à l'Empire, 1789-1804.
- 1841 Saint-Vincent de Paul.
- 1843 Les français sous la Révolution, with W.Tenint.
- 1843 Un été en Espagne.
- 1851 Isabelle Farnèse.
- 1852 Histoire de France.
- 1859 Le Rosier (drame)
- 1860 Histoire du Piémont et de la maison de Savoie.
- 1860 Histoire anecdotique de la Fronde, 1643-1653.
- 1860 Histoire inédit des papes depuis saint Pierre à nos jours.
- 1861 Histoire populaire des papes depuis saint Pierre à la poclamation du royaume d'Italie.
- 1861 La régence galante.
- 1862 Les grands capitaines amoureux.
- 1863 Le roman de la plage.
- 1865-1873 Mémoires du peuple français depuis son origine à nos jours, 8 volumes.
- 1873 L'ancien boulevard du Temnple.
- 1874 Histoire de la mode en France, Bureau du Magasin des Demoiselles.
- 1875 Les amuseurs de la rue.
- 1875 Le roi d'une île déserte.
- 1877 Les légendes de la place Maubert.
- 1879 Les revenants de la place de Grève.
- 1880 Colbert.
- 1883 La France et les Français à travers les siècles, 2 volumes.
- 1883 Précis d'histoire de France.
- 1884 Récits d'autrefois
- 1885 Souvenirs d'un Hugolâtre; la génération de 1830.
- 1886 Histoire de la liberté en France depuis les origines à 1789.
- 1886 Histoire de la liberté en France depuis 1789 à nos jours.
- 1887 La France à vol d'oiseauau moyen âge.
- 1888 Velléda.
- 1889 Album du Centenaire. Grands hommes et grands faits de la Révolution Française, with Désiré Lacroix.
- 1894 Vive la patrie!.
- 1895 Les clubs contre-revolutionnaires.
