= Expedition of the Col des Beni Aïcha =

- Part of the French conquest of Algeria
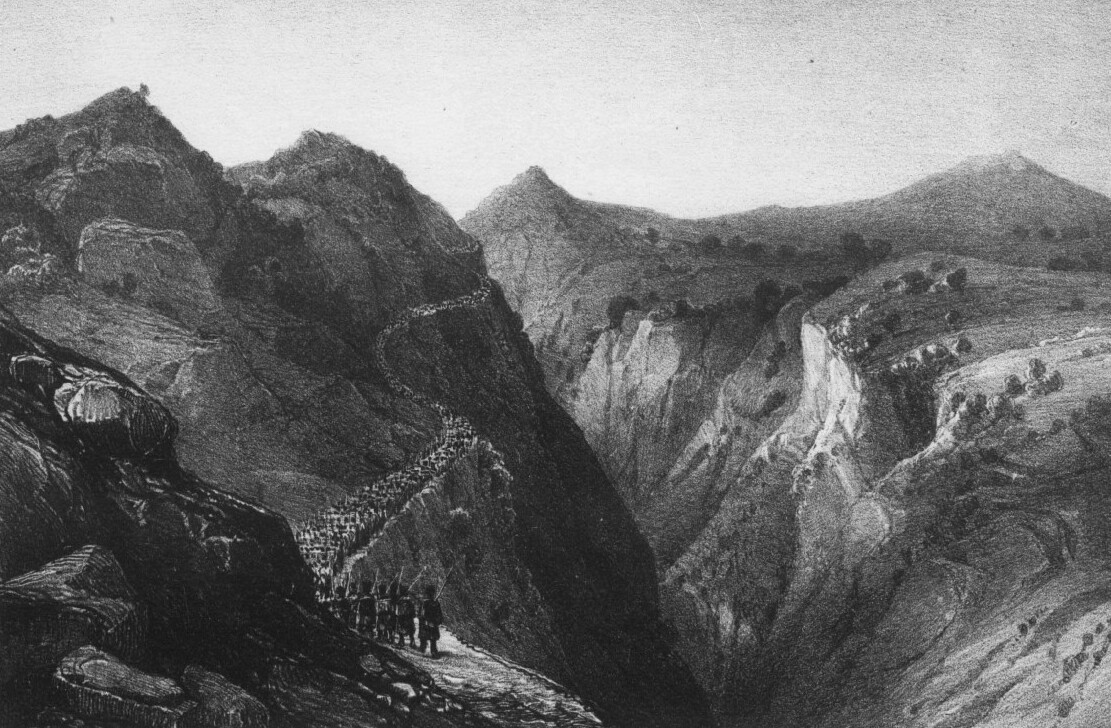
- Meraldene valley in Thenia
Date	17–19 May 1837
Location	Thenia, Kabylia 36.7246254°N 3.5568208°E
Result	Algerian victory

Belligerents
Kabyles tribes : Iflissen Umellil; Igawawen; Isser; Political support : Emirate of Mascara	Kingdom of France

Commanders and leaders
Cheikh Ali Boushaki; Cheikh Ben Zamoum	(France) Damrémont (France) Schauenburg (France) Perrégaux (France) La Torré (France) Lixières

Strength
2,000 Kabyles	3,000 infantrymen

The Expedition of the Col des Beni Aïcha, or the Expedition of Thénia, or simply Beni Aïcha Expedition, was an expedition in May 1837, during the French conquest of Algeria. This event pitted the troupes coloniales under Colonel Maximilien Joseph Schauenburg against the troops of Beni Aïcha of the Igawawen.

== Historical context ==
This expedition was started in May 1837 from Algiers to the city of Constantine via the mountain range of Khachna in Kabylia.

This military reaction came after the signing of the Treaty of Tafna between General Thomas Robert Bugeaud with Emir Abdelkader in Orania.

The treaty effectively recognized the control of the Emirate of Abdelkader over a large part of the interior area of what is now Algeria.

Emir Abdekader exploited this treaty to assert his power over the tribes throughout the interior of the country, building new towns far from French control with a rigorous administration.

He worked especially in Kabylia and elsewhere to raise the Muslim population under French control to resist by both peaceful and military means their possession.

He wanted to control the road route passing through the main rivers connecting Algiers to Constantine, in this case Oued Réghaïa, Oued Boudouaou, Oued Corso, Oued Boumerdès, Oued Meraldene and Oued Isser.

This desire of Emir Abdelkader to face the French again, even after signing the treaty, led him to claim under this pact all the territory east of Oued Boudouaou among the Kabyles of Beni Aïcha and which in fact included the main road between Algiers and Constantine.

== Raid on Reghaïa ==
The Emir Abdelkader organized on 8 May 1837 the attack in the region of Réghaïa on the farm named Mercier, installed in an agricultural concession adjoining the border of the Emirate of Abdelkader and consisting of the Oued Boudouaou also nicknamed Oued Keddara, and this, was to impose his yoke and reign on the edge of his state declared by the Treaty of Tafna.

The Emir knew that his allies in the Kabyle tribes of Khachna and Issers could mobilize up to six thousand (6000) men on foot and up to eight hundred (800) cavalry in the field to harass the French establishments beyond the current Boudouaou.

This is how the Emir, when he organized the attack on Réghaïa and the looting of French colonial farms, was guaranteed to have safe shelter with the marabouts of the Beni Aïcha, whose villages overlook Oued Meraldene and Oued Isser.

General Damrémont was taken aback in Algiers when he learned that the eastern suburbs of the Casbah of Algiers were in turmoil under the blows of untimely attacks by rebels affiliated with Emir Abdelkader.

The general then ordered Colonel Maximilien Joseph Schauenburg to prepare an expedition by land and sea to attack the relief and shelter of Emir Abdelkader among the Beni Aïcha to dislodge this nebula made up of dozens of villages which were stationed not far from Algiers.

Colonel Schauenburg was already stationed in Réghaïa as the head of the cavaliers of the 1st African Hunter Regiment to protect and guard the agricultural farms that had been looted at the start of hostilities in the spring of 1837.

== Intrusion among the Beni Aïcha ==
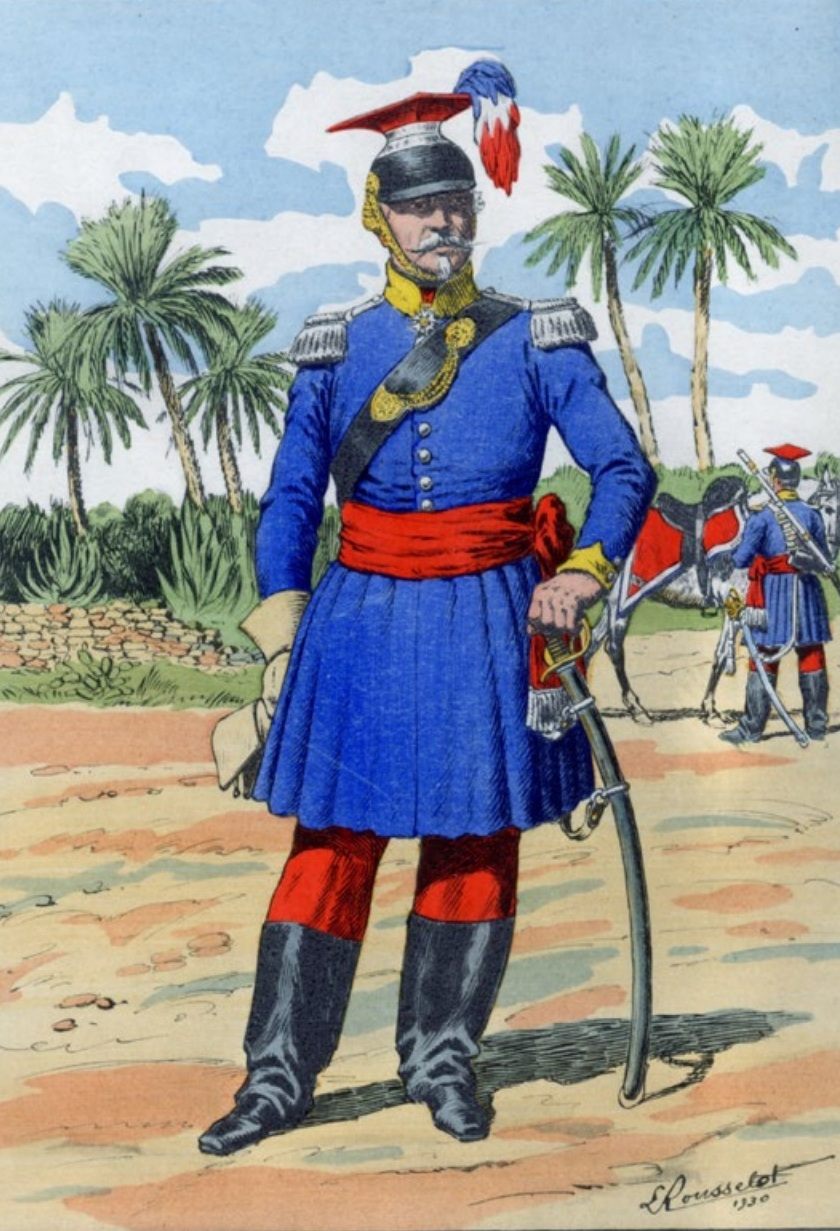
Maximilien Joseph Schauenburg

General Damrémont ordered Colonel Schauenburg to march at night with his military column from Réghaïa towards the Meraldene ravine to surprise the insurgents in their sleep, while General Alexandre Charles Perrégaux was instructed to lead a maritime embarkation starting from the Port of Algiers and which was to land on the shore of the current Zemmouri El Bahri in the place of the Port of Zemmouri.

The strategy that followed consisted having General Pérregaux disembark from his boat with about a thousand infantry and cannon on the shore of the Beni Aïcha in order to ambush and wait for the Kabyle rebels fleeing the battle of Colonel Schauenburg to the north of Meraldene ravine by rising through the villages of Boukhanfar and Talamali, in order to decimate and annihilate them.

The bad weather which suddenly occurred on the Bay of Algiers threw away this well-established plan because General Pérregaux was held up by the stormy storm and could not get his boat out of the harbor of the port of Algiers.

Despite the bad weather that had fallen in the middle of May 1837 on Mitidja and Kabylia, Colonel Schauenburg left on the night of 17 May 1837 from his camp in Réghaïa to descend towards the ravine of Oued Boudouaou on which he had assembled a military column of two thousand men to attack the Beni Aïcha.

This military column was composed of two battalions of the 2nd light infantry regiment, a battalion of the 48th infantry regiment, two hundred cavalry hunters of the 1st African Hunter Regiment, regular spahis, one hundred irregular spahis, and two pieces of mountain infantry.

Colonel Schauenburg was held back with his thousands of soldiers by rain and wind in his sustained night march before reaching the Meraldene ravine only at eight in the morning of the next day 18 May 1837, where groups of Kabyles awaited him to counter it and to hinder its advance in Kabylia if it managed to cross the bed of Oued Isser.

Under the command of Cheikh Ali Boushaki, the hundreds of Kabyles perched on the villages of Meraldene, Gueddara, Soumâa, Djenah and Beni Arab among others began to run and enter into an altercation with the French, and thus a whole first battalion of the 2nd light infantry regiment was launched on the regrouping of the Algerian resistance fighters to quickly seize the important position of the Col des Beni Aïcha, and which would cost dearly to the French if this seizure was delayed and remained under the control of the allies of Emir Abdelkader.

As the Kabyles were driven back towards the descent of the villages of Baloul and Tebabkha near the course of Oued Isser on the long defile of the eastern flank of the Khachna massif, the other villages folded up on the heights and entered in line in the confrontation with the regiment infantry which then suffered some human losses in its ranks.

A chase began between the Kabyle insurgents and the French soldiers to take control of this opening between Mitidja and Kabylia, since a large reinforcement ran from Laazib Zamoum to reinforce the Beni Aïcha in their resistance on an ancestral land which was favorable and advantageous to them on all levels.

== Ben Zamoum counterattack ==
After the soldiers of Colonel Schauenburg's military column were scattered near Oued Isser during the day of 18 May 1837, an order was given to them to gather their elongated ranks into a reformed group.

Cheikh Ben Zamoum then came from the Iflissen Umellil region with about two thousand (2,000) Algerians to stop Colonel Schauenburg's advance towards his territory if the Beni Aïcha region failed in blocking the advance of the French invaders.

The plain of Issers, which opened up to the French, saw the arrival of contingents from Iflissen Umellil to stop the 2nd light infantry regiment in its dangerous advance.

But the French prevented this attack of the Kabyle by knocking them down and frightening them vigorously, then the infantry and spahis moved towards the northern shore while deploying skirmishers in the distance on the sides of the mountains to protect them from the pursuit and the stalking Algerians.

Schauenburg ordered to quickly drive out the surprised populations with their herds to accost them on the beach of Oued Merdja where no disembarkation had taken place because of the showers and hail, and this is how the Kabyle men and animals arrived at escape from the trap and the bee-eater that had been given to them.

== Turning back ==
The expeditionary operation of 1837 against the Beni Aïcha was missed by Colonel Schauenburg because of the lack of time and the determination of the Kabyles to defend their families, their villages and their land, and with the backing of the insurgents of the Beni Aïcha by their brothers of Iflissen arriving from Laazib Zamoum.

Schauenburg realized that a longer stay in the country of the Beni Aïcha insurgents would attract him, without good possible result since Kabyles reinforcements and forces was greater than the strength of his military column, hence his announced and planned defeat.

This colonel brought back the next day 19 May 1837 by a very strong march his expeditionary force towards his initial camp between Boudouaou and Réghaïa.

== See also ==
- Emir Abdelkader
- Emirate of Abdelkader
- Igawawen
- French conquest of Algeria
- First Battle of Boudouaou
- List of French governors of Algeria
- Charles-Marie Denys de Damrémont
- Maximilien Joseph Schauenburg
- Alexandre Charles Perrégaux
- Antoine de La Torré

== Bibliography ==
- Armand-Gabriel Rozey (1840). Cris de conscience de l'Algérie. Paris: Rousseau, Libraire. pp. 342–343.
- George Henri Schuster (1842). Correspondance militaire, ou recueil de modèles, pièces et actes authentiques relatifs au service militaire. Vienna: P. Rohrmann, Libraire. pp. 132–133.
- Léon Galibert (1843). Histoire de l'Algérie, ancienne et moderne. Paris: Furne et Cie, Libraires-Éditeurs. pp. 474–475.
- Léon Galibert (1844). L'Algérie ancienne et moderne. Paris: Furne et Cie, Libraires-Éditeurs. pp. 625–626.
- Moritz Wagner (1854). The Tricolor on the Atlas, or, Algeria and the French Conquest. New York: Thomas Nelson. pp. 288–289.
- Louis-Adrien Berbrugger (1857). Les époques militaires de la Grande Kabilie. Algiers: Bastide, Librairie-Éditeur. pp. 13–15.
- Edouard Carteron (1858). Compleḿent de l'Encycloped́ie moderne - Tome septième. Paris: Firmin Didot et Cie, Imprimeurs-Libraires. p. 376.
- Ferdinand-Philippe d'Orléans (1870). Campagnes de l'armée d'Afrique, 1835-1839. Paris: Michel Lévy Frères. pp. 270–274.
- Ferdinand-Désiré Quesnoy (1888). L'armée d'Afrique depuis la conquête d'Alger. Paris: Jouvet et Cie, Éditeurs. pp. 116–117.
- Georges Yver (1927). Correspondance du général Damrémont (1837). Paris: Honoré Champion, Librairie ancienne. pp. 150–164–173.
