= Gueddara =

Village in the Boumerdès Province in Kabylie, Algeria

Coordinates: 36.7078101°N 3.5529968°E

Gueddara is a village in the Boumerdès Province in Kabylie, Algeria.

== Location ==
The village is surrounded by Meraldene River and the town of Thenia in the Khachna mountain range.

== Zawiya ==
- Zawiyet Sidi Boushaki

== History ==
This village has experienced the facts of several historical events:

- Expedition of the Col des Beni Aïcha (1837)
- Battle of the Col des Beni Aïcha (1871)
