= Tebabkha =

Coordinates: 36.7160509°N 3.5687861°E

Tebabkha is a village in the Boumerdès Province in Kabylie, Algeria.

== Location ==
The village is surrounded by Soumâa and the town of Thenia in the Khachna mountain range.
