= Thénia =

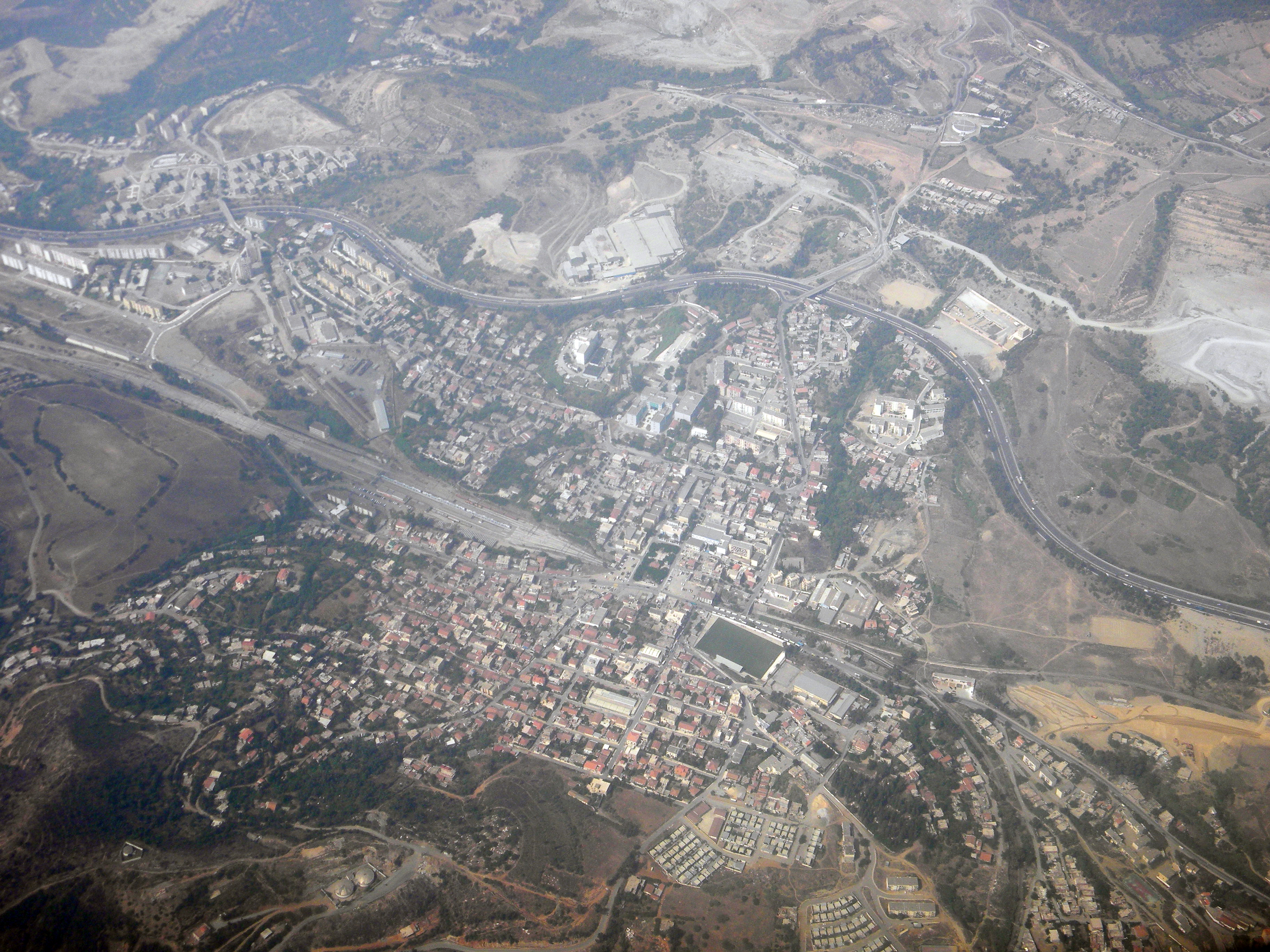

- Location within Algeria
- Coordinates: 36°43′40″N 3°33′14″E
- Country: Algeria
- Province: Boumerdès
- Elevation: 301 m (988 ft)

Population (1998)
  - Total: 19,078
- Time zone: UTC+1 (West Africa Time)

Thénia (الثنية), sometimes written as Thenia, with around 40,000 inhabitants, is the chief town in the daïra of the same name, in the wilaya of Boumerdès, in northern Algeria. Historically, the name is a contraction of "Theniet Beni Aicha" (ثنية بني عائشة) ("the mountain pass of the sons of Aisha"), the Arabic translation of the Kabyle Berber toponym Tizi n At Ɛica. The steep-sided pass, which is only about 800 metres (2,600 ft) wide at its narrowest point, is sometimes taken to mark the transition between Mitidja and Grande Kabylie.

== Villages ==
The villages of the commune of Thénia are:

- B
  - Baloul
  - Ben Daoud
  - Beni Arab
  - Boukhanfar
- D
  - Draâ Ben Hadhoum
- G
  - Gueddara
- H
  - Hadadcha
- L
  - Louz
- M
  - Mahrane
  - Meraldene
  - Merchicha
  - Mezala
- O
  - Ouled Ali
  - Ouled Bessa
  - Ouled Mahmoud
  - Ouled Salah
- S
  - Sidi Fredj
  - Skhirat
  - Soumâa
- T
  - Tabrahimt
  - Talamali
  - Tamsaout
  - Tebabkha
  - Tizouighine

== Geography ==
Thénia is located on the main road from Algiers to Constantine, about 40 kilometres (25 mi) east of Algiers, about 10 kilometres (6.2 mi) inland from the coast, at an altitude of 300 metres (980 ft). Between the town and the coast, the scrub-covered Djebel bou Arous rises to a height of around 400 metres (1,300 ft) and then falls more gently to the coast. South and east is the valley of the Isser River, whose sides rise to around 600 metres (2,000 ft) and are deeply incised by streams. In many places the slopes are covered with vineyards and olive-groves.

Thénia is on the double-track portion of the Algiers-Skikda railway line and is the end of electric commuter rail service from Algiers station.

== Zawiya ==
- Zawiyet Sidi Boushaki

== History ==
During the French occupation, the town was renamed Ménerville, after Charles-Louis Pinson de Ménerville (1808–76), the first president of the court of appeals in Algiers. It resumed the name of Thénia a few years after independence in 1962.

In 1944, the town had 2,656 inhabitants, of whom the majority, 1,929, were European pieds noirs while the commune or district had 12,755, of whom 2,640 were pieds noirs.

Thénia was very near to the offshore epicenter of the 21 May 2003 Boumerdès earthquake, the strongest earthquake to hit Algeria since 1980.

At least four people were killed and around 20 injured by a car bomb outside a police station in the town on 29 January 2008.

=== French conquest ===
- Battle of Thénia (1837), a battle during the French conquest of Algeria.
- First Battle of the Issers (1837), a battle during the French conquest of Algeria.
- Battle of Thénia (1846), a battle during the French conquest of Algeria.
- Battle of Thénia (1871), a battle during the Mokrani Revolt of Algeria.

=== Algerian Revolution ===
- Ferme Gauthier

=== Salafist terrorism ===
- 2008 Thénia bombing (29 January 2008)
- 2012 Thénia bombing (11 January 2012)

== Roads ==
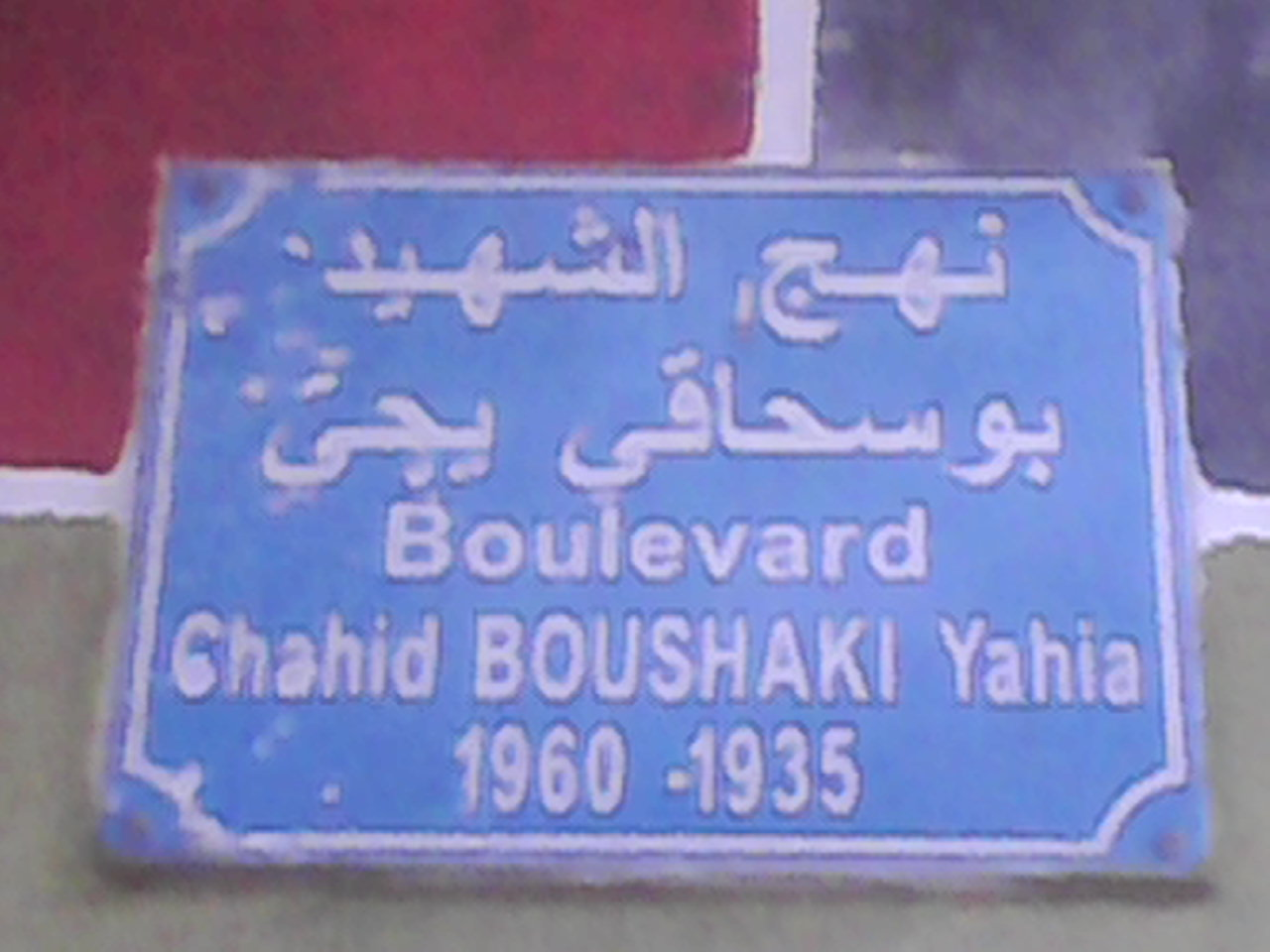
Yahia Boushaki Boulevard

The town of Thénia contains dozens of roads in its urban network:

- Ali Anou Street
- Ramdane Redjouani Street
- Rabah Rahmoune Street
- Slimane Ambar Street
- Mohamed Khemisti Avenue

== Rivers ==
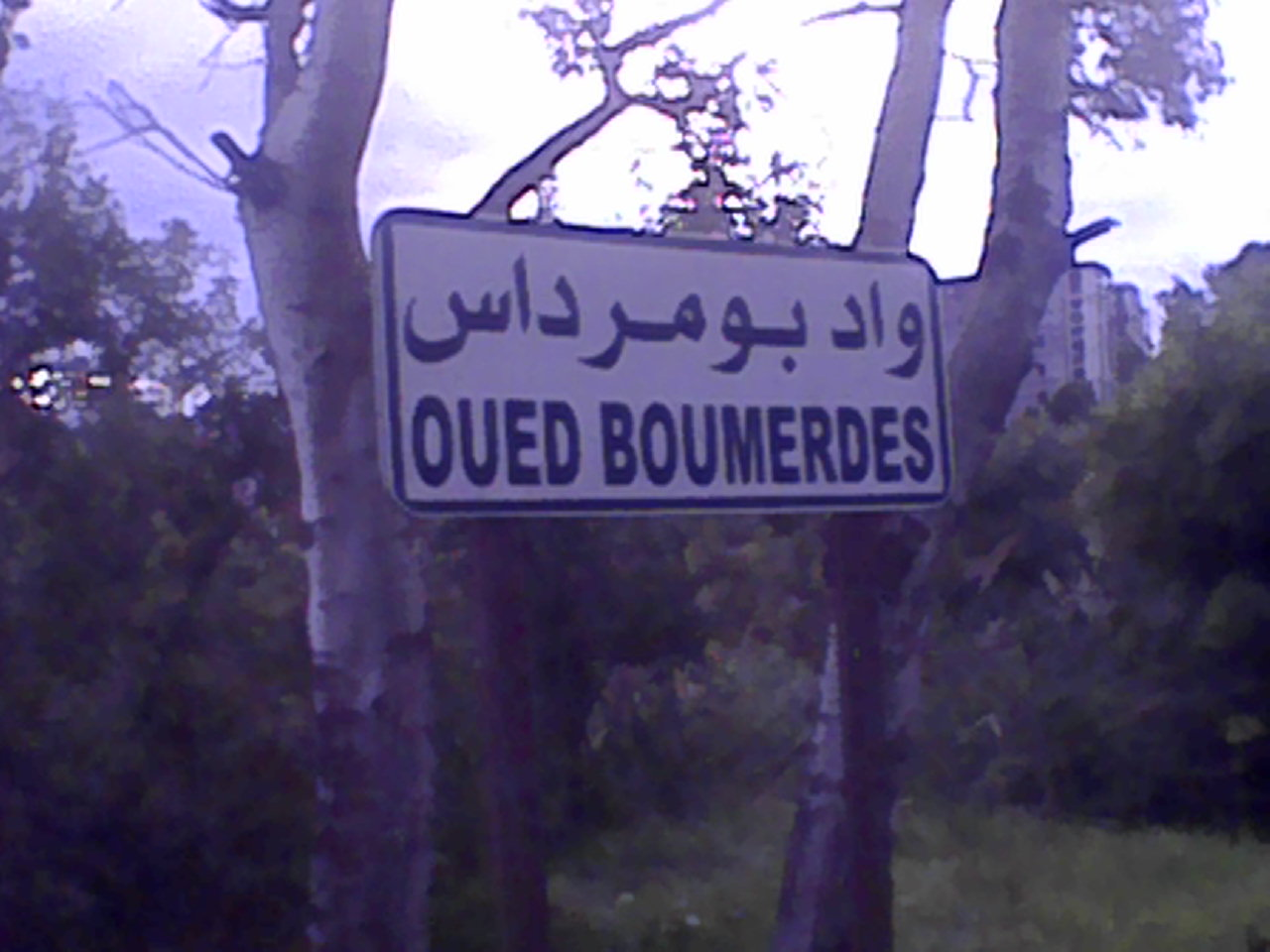
Boumerdès River

This commune is crossed by several rivers:

- Isser River
- Meraldene River
- Arbia River
- Beni Arab River
- Boumerdès River
- Keddache River

== Dam ==
This commune has one dam:

- Meraldene Dam

== Football clubs ==
Club	Division	Level	Location	Logo
CMB Thénia	Ligue Régional II	5	Thénia	

== Notable people ==
- Sidi Boushaki, Algerian theologian.
- Abdenour Boushaki, Algerian politician.
- Abderrahmane Boushaki, Algerian leader.
- Ahmed Bourenane, Algerian politician.
- Ahmed Hadhoum, Algerian politician.
- Ali Boushaki, Algerian theologian.
- Amine ibn El Boushaki, Algerian judoka.
- Brahim Boushaki, Algerian theologian.
- Dahmane Deriche, Algerian politician.
- Dahmane Deriche, Algerian artist.
- Farid Ishak Boushaki, Algerian academician.
- Feriel Boushaki, Algerian artist.
- Firmus, Berber leader.
- Fodil Mezali, an Algerian journalist.
- Gildo, Berber leader.
- Hocine Soltani, Algerian boxer.
- Lyès Deriche, Algerian leader.
- Mascezel, Berber leader.
- Mohamed Aïchaoui, Algerian journalist.
- Mohamed Allalou, Algerian boxer.
- Mohamed Boumerdassi, Algerian artist.
- Mohamed Bourenane, Algerian politician.
- Mohamed Deriche, Algerian politician.
- Mohamed Deriche, Algerian academician.
- Mohamed Mechkarini, Algerian militant.
- Mohamed Missouri, Algerian boxer.
- Mohamed Nassim Boushaki, Algerian academician.
- Mohamed Rahmoune, Algerian politician.
- Mohamed Seghir Boushaki, Algerian politician.
- Mustapha Ishak Boushaki, Algerian academician.
- Nadia Boumerdassi, Algerian artist.
- Noureddine Melikechi, Algerian physicist.
- Nubel, Berber leader.
- Rachid Deriche, Algerian academician.
- Salah Bouchatal, Algerian politician.
- Salem Anou, Algerian politician.
- Shahnez Boushaki, Algerian basketball player.
- Tarek Boushaki, Algerian academician.
- Yahia Boushaki (Shahid), Algerian politician.
