= Meraldene =

Village in Kabylie, Algeria

Meraldene مغلدن - مرابطين
- Nickname: Merabtene
- Motto: مغلدن - مرابطين
- Interactive map of Meraldene
- Coordinates: 36.7025804°N 3.5404655°E
- Commune: Thénia
- District: Thénia District
- Province: Boumerdès Province
- Region: Kabylie
- Country: Algeria

Area
  - Total: 5 km^{2} (1.9 sq mi)

Dimensions
  - Length: 2.5 km (1.6 mi)
  - Width: 2 km (1.2 mi)
- Elevation: 400 m (1,300 ft)
- Time zone: UTC+01:00
- Area code: 35005
- Website: thenia.net

Meraldene or Merabtene is a village in the Boumerdès Province in Kabylie, Algeria.

== Location ==
The village is surrounded by Meraldene River, the Meraldene Dam and the town of Thénia in the Khachna mountain range.

== Zawiya ==
- Zawiyet Sidi Boushaki

== History ==
This village has experienced the facts of several historical events:

- Battle of the Col des Beni Aïcha (1837)
- Battle of the Col des Beni Aïcha (1846)
- Battle of the Col des Beni Aïcha (1871)

== Structures ==
- Meraldene Dam

== Water ==
- Meraldene River

== Notable people ==
- Sidi Boushaki, Algerian theologian.
- Cheikh Ali Boushaki, Algerian leader.
- Cheikh Mohamed Boushaki, Algerian leader.
- Ali Boushaki, Algerian theologian.
- Mohamed Seghir Boushaki, Algerian politician.
- Amine ibn El Boushaki, Algerian judoka.
- Mohamed Nassim Boushaki, Algerian academician.
- Mustapha Ishak Boushaki, Algerian academician.
- Shahnez Boushaki, Algerian basketball player.
- Firmus, Berber leader.
- Gildo, Berber leader.
- Mascezel, Berber leader.
- Nubel, Berber leader.

== Gallery ==
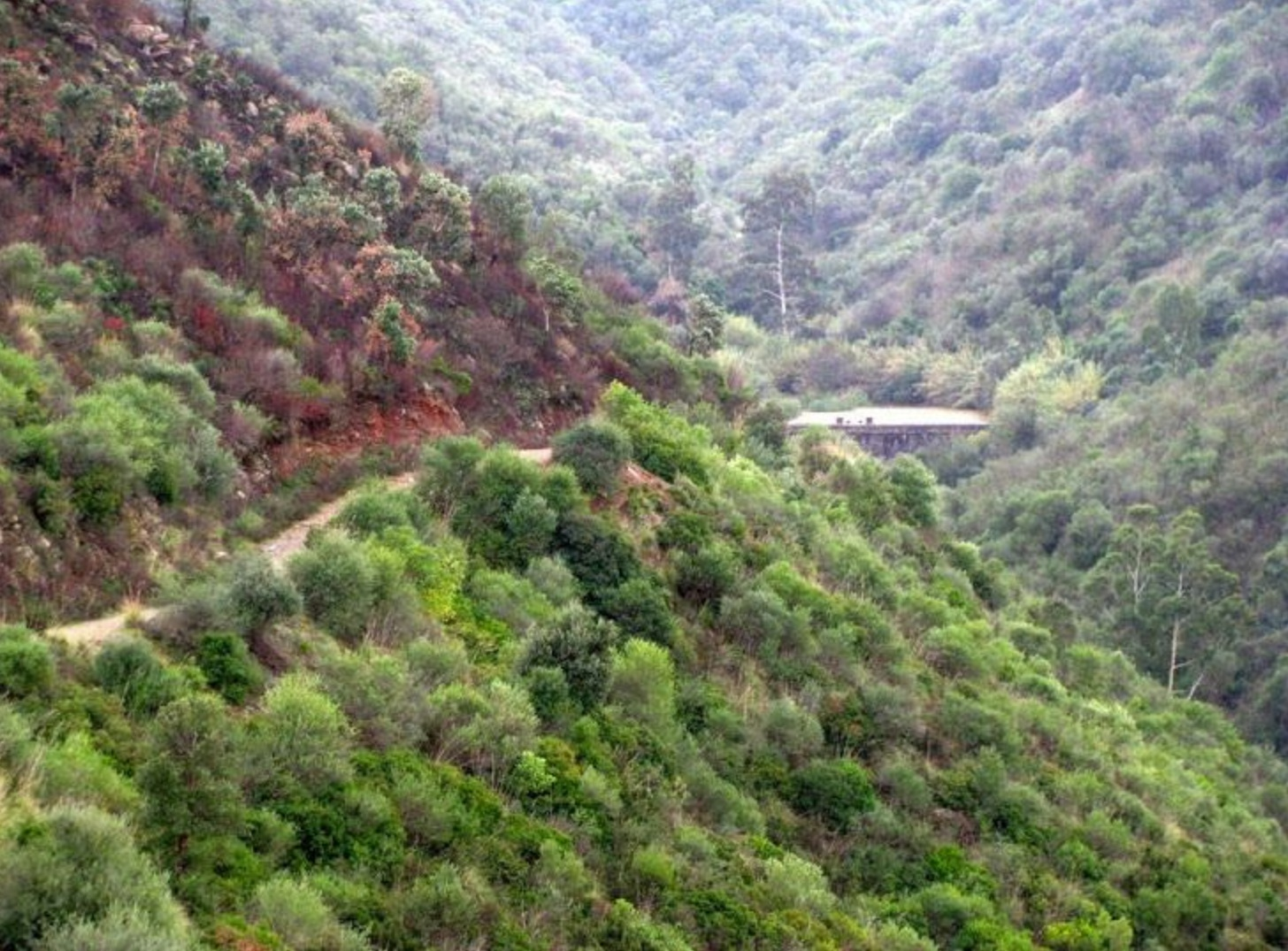
Dam on Meraldene River

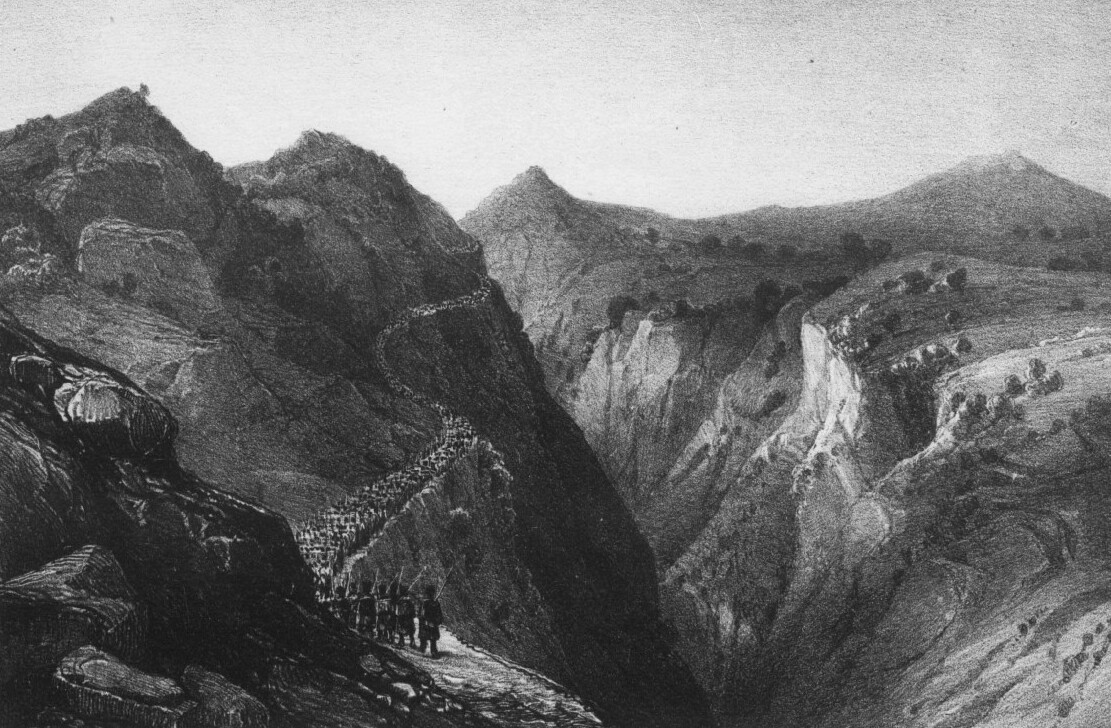
Meraldene Ravin.
