= Boumerdès District =

Coordinates: 36°46′00″N 3°28′38″E

Boumerdès District دائرة بومرداس
- District
- Map of Algeria highlighting Boumerdès Province
- Country: Algeria
- Province: Boumerdès
- District seat: Boumerdès

Population (1998)
  - Total: 60,652
- Time zone: UTC+01 (CET)
- Municipalities: 3

Boumerdès is a district in Boumerdès Province, Algeria. It was named after its capital, Boumerdès, which is also the capital of the province.

== Municipalities ==
The district is further divided into 3 municipalities:

- Boumerdès
- Tidjelabine
- Corso

== Neighbourhoods ==
The neighbourhoods of Boumerdès District are:

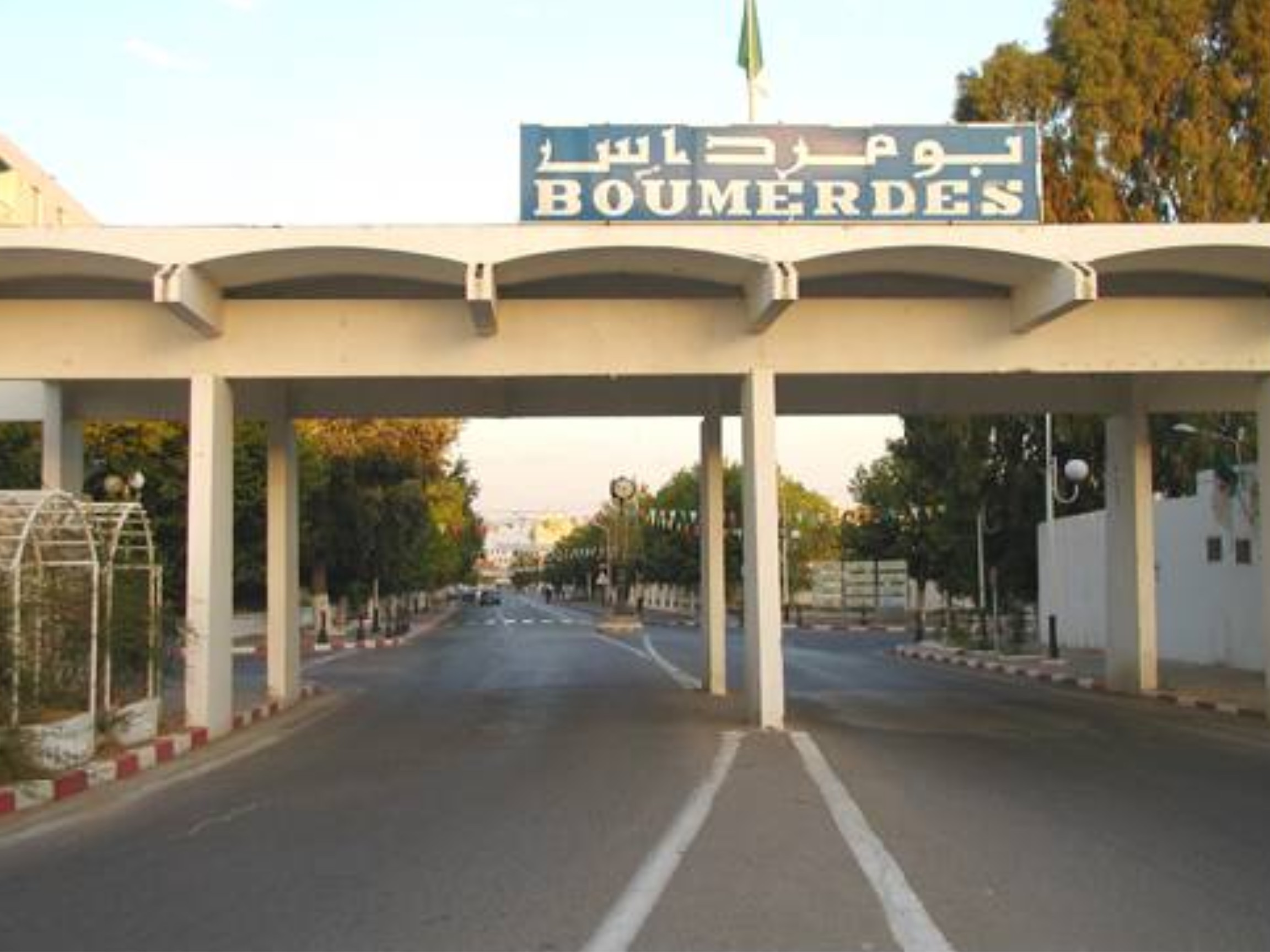
Cité Ali Bouyahiaoui

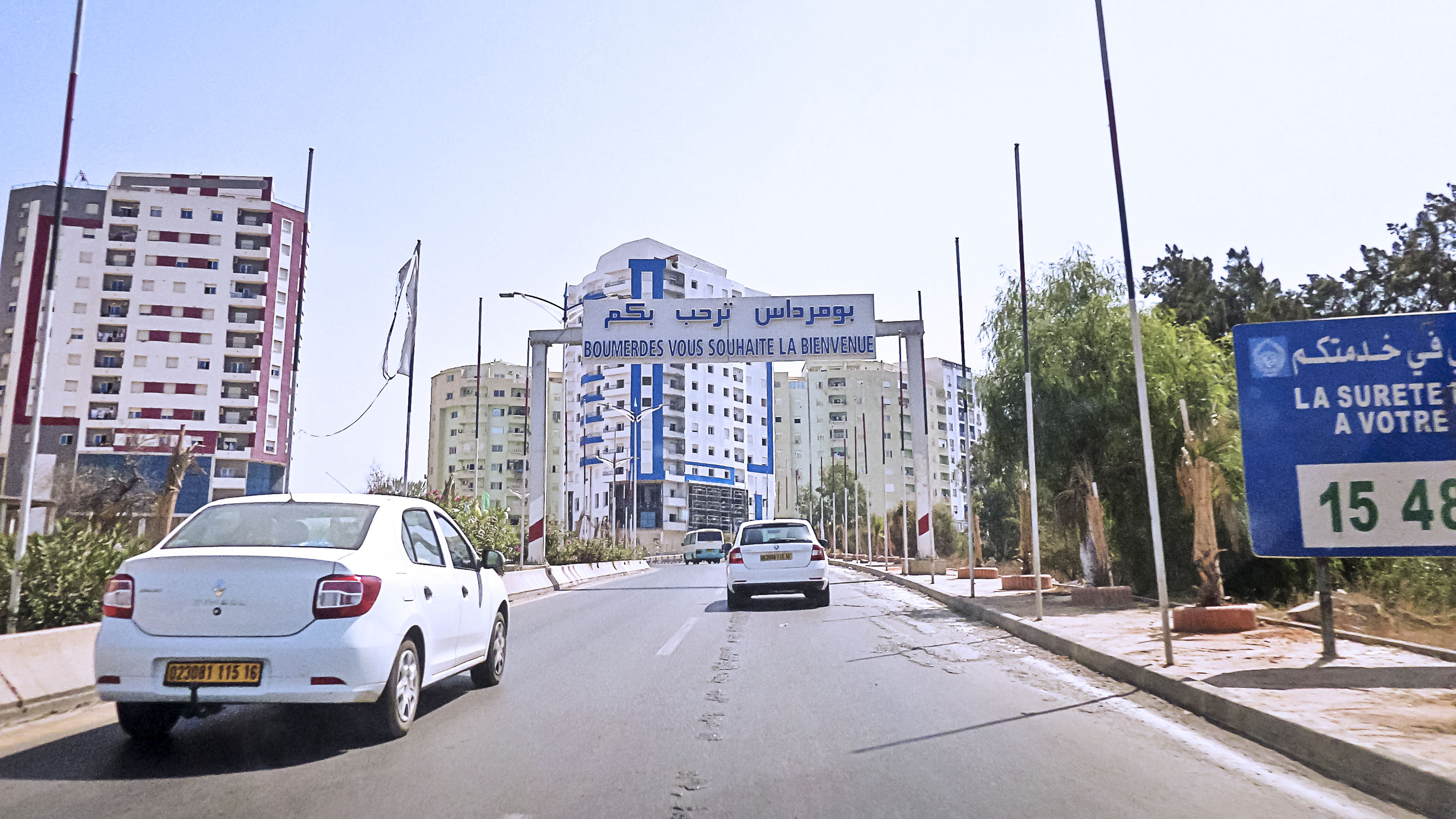
Cité 11 décembre 1960

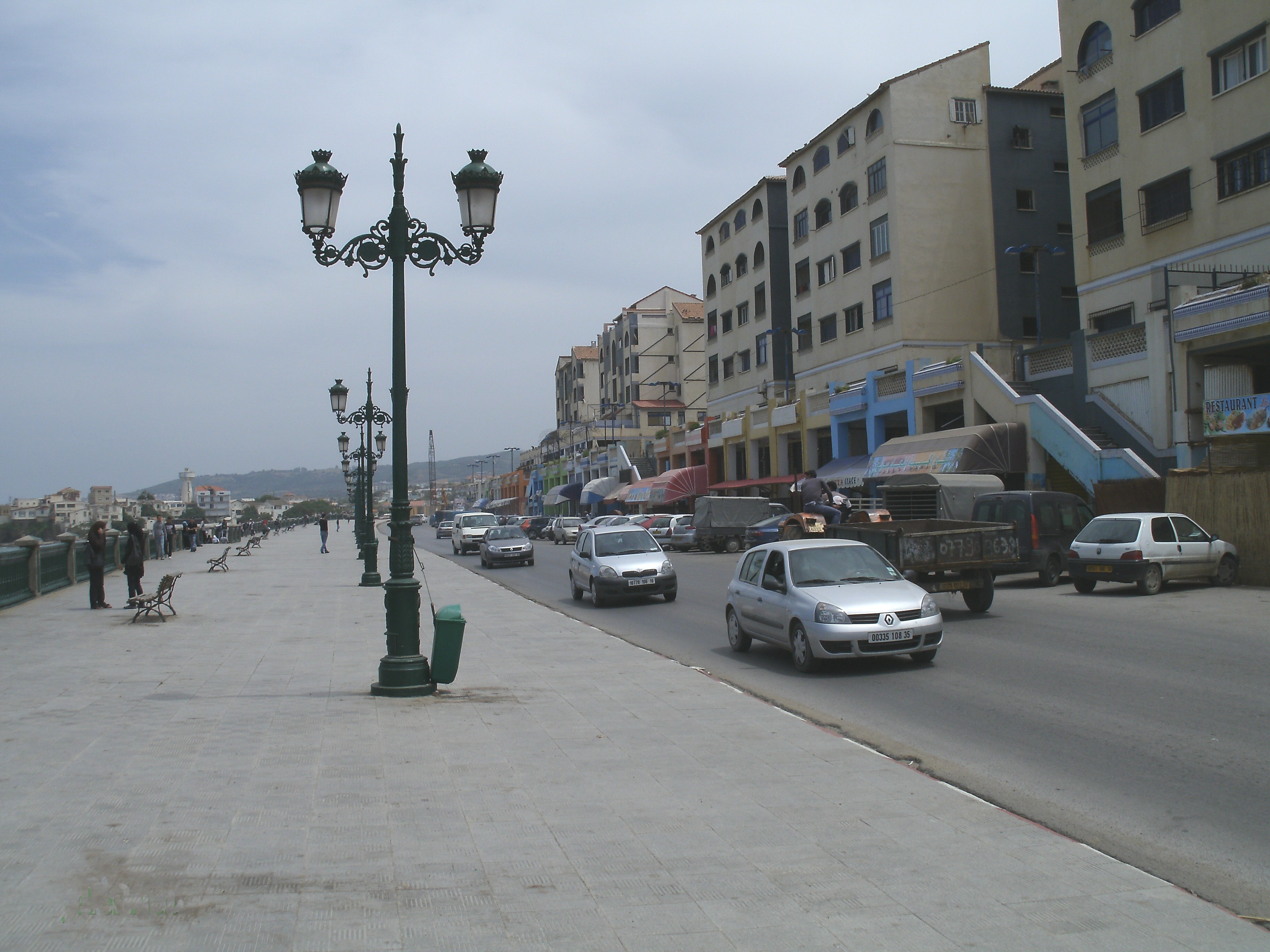
Quartier du front de mer

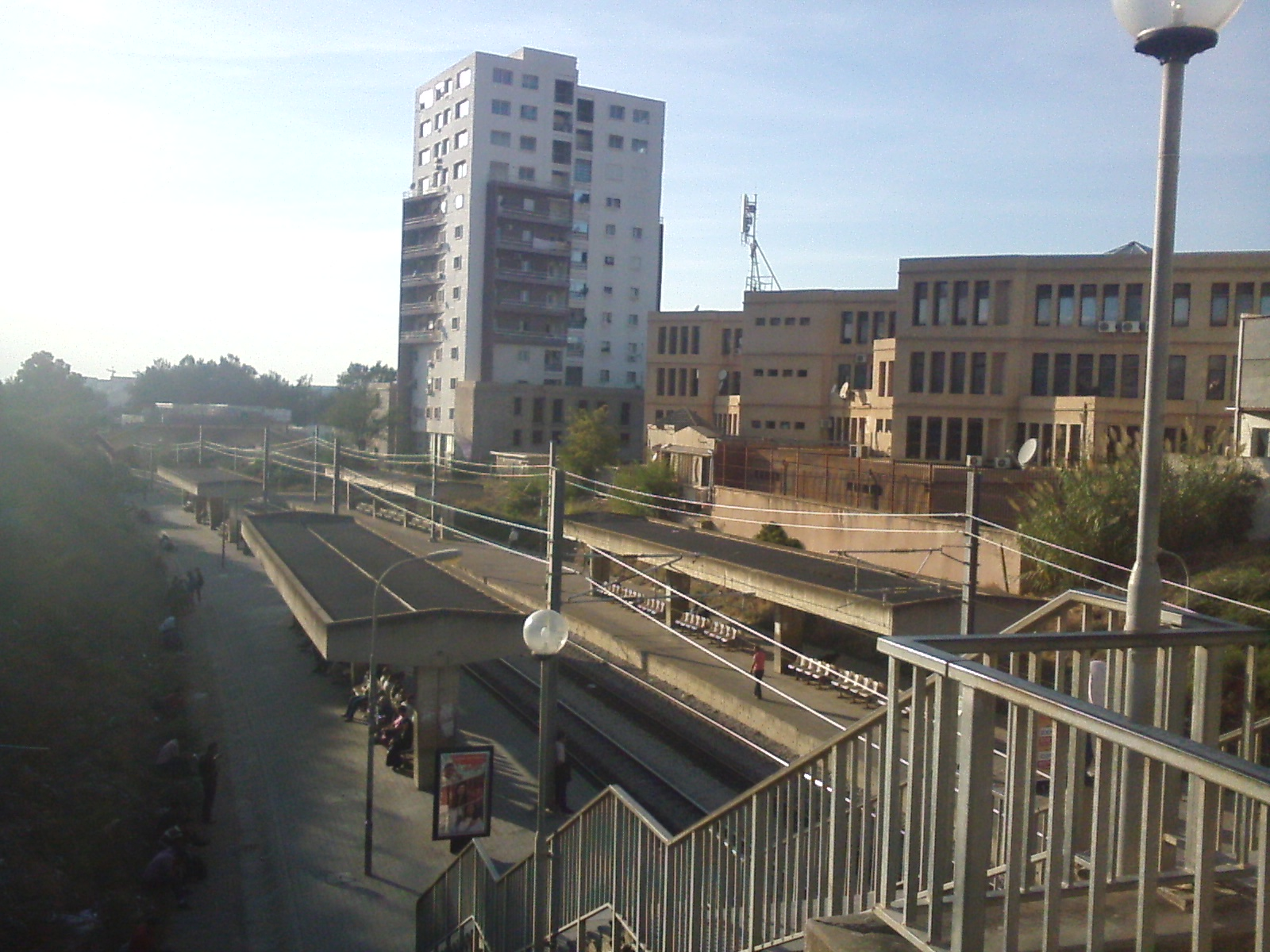
Cité Ibn Khaldoun

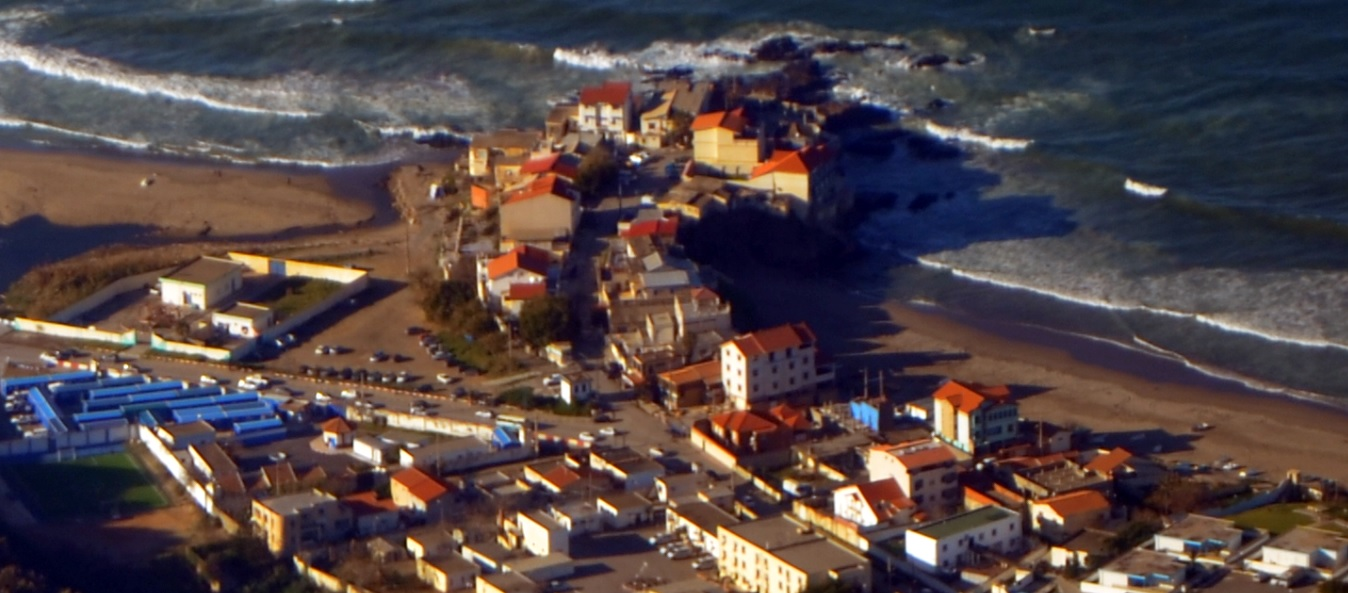
Cité du Rocher Noir

== Villages ==
The villages of Boumerdès District are:

- A
  - Ahl El Koudia
  - Ahl El Oued
- B
  - Belhasnet
  - Beni Fouda
  - Berreghlou
- M
  - Mahsas
  - Medjber
  - Meraïel
- O
  - Ouled Boumerdès
- S
  - Sidi Yahia

== Geology ==
Several mountain peaks are found in this district:

- Ben Norah Mount (467 m)
- Bouarous Mount (444 m)
- Cap Blanc Mount (420 m)

== Rivers ==
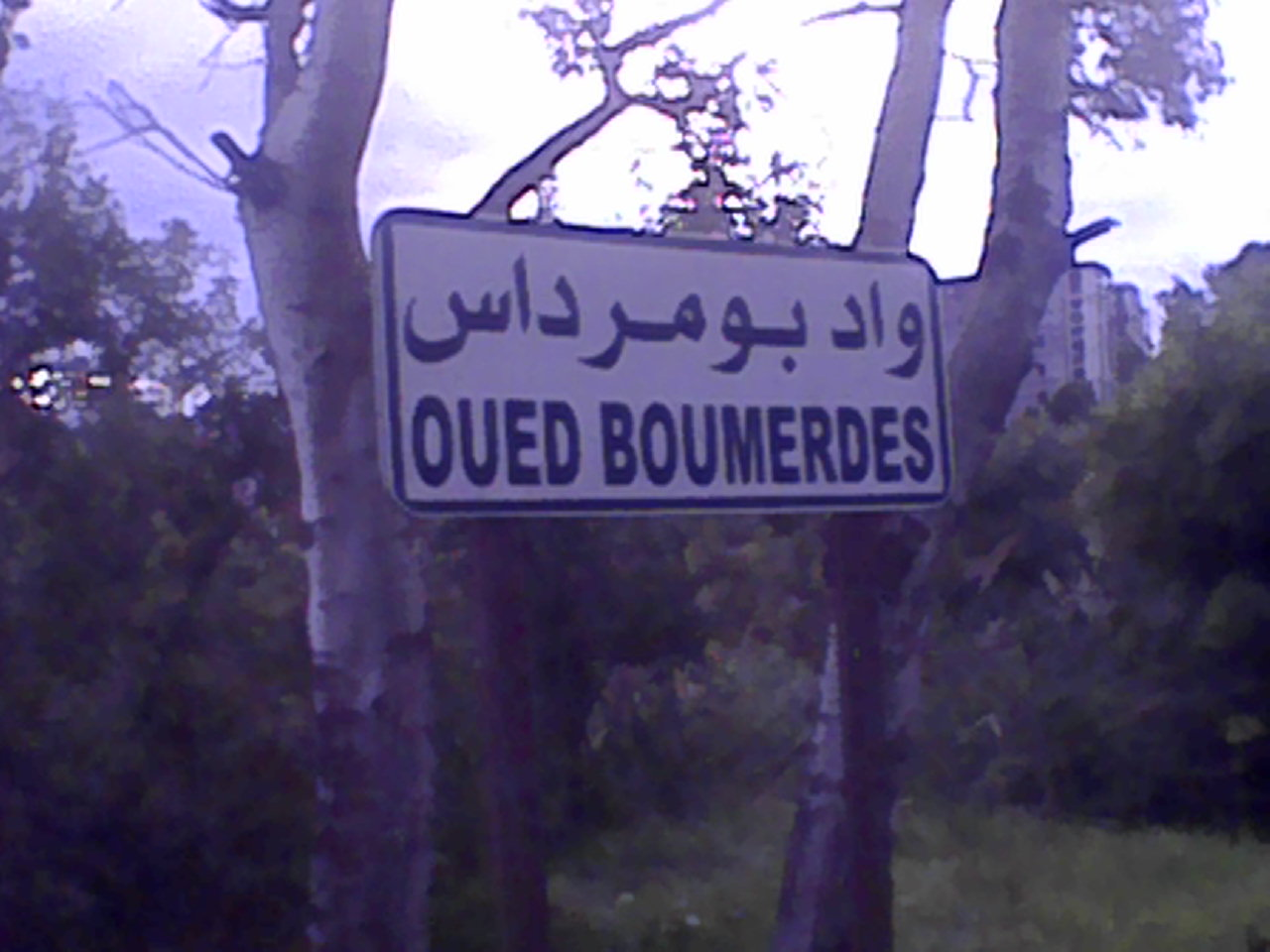
Boumerdès River

This district is crossed by several rivers:

- Meraldene River
- Beni Arab River
- Boumerdès River
- Corso River
- El Karma River
- Sidi Ali River
- Tatarig River

== Religion ==
- Zawiyet Sidi Boumerdassi

== History ==
=== French conquest ===
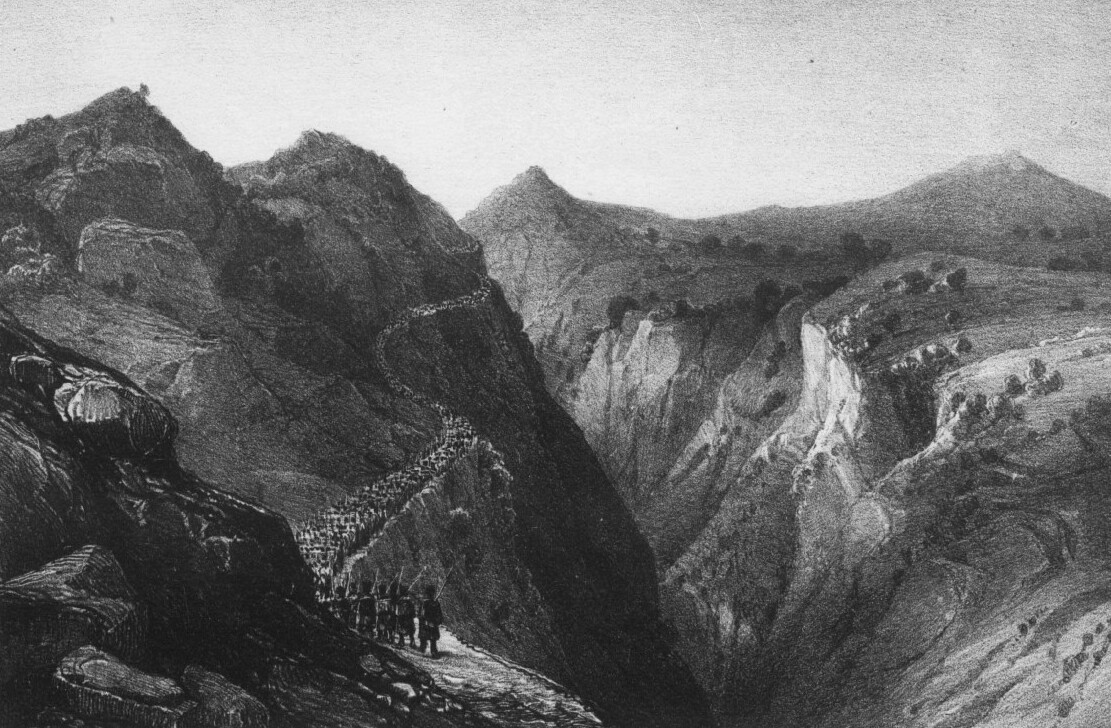
Expedition of the Col des Beni Aïcha (1837)

- Expedition of the Col des Beni Aïcha (1837)
- First Battle of the Issers (1837)

=== Salafist terrorism ===
- 2005 Tidjelabine bombing (29 July 2005)
- 2006 Tidjelabine bombing (19 June 2006)
- 2010 Tidjelabine bombing (7 April 2010)

== Health ==
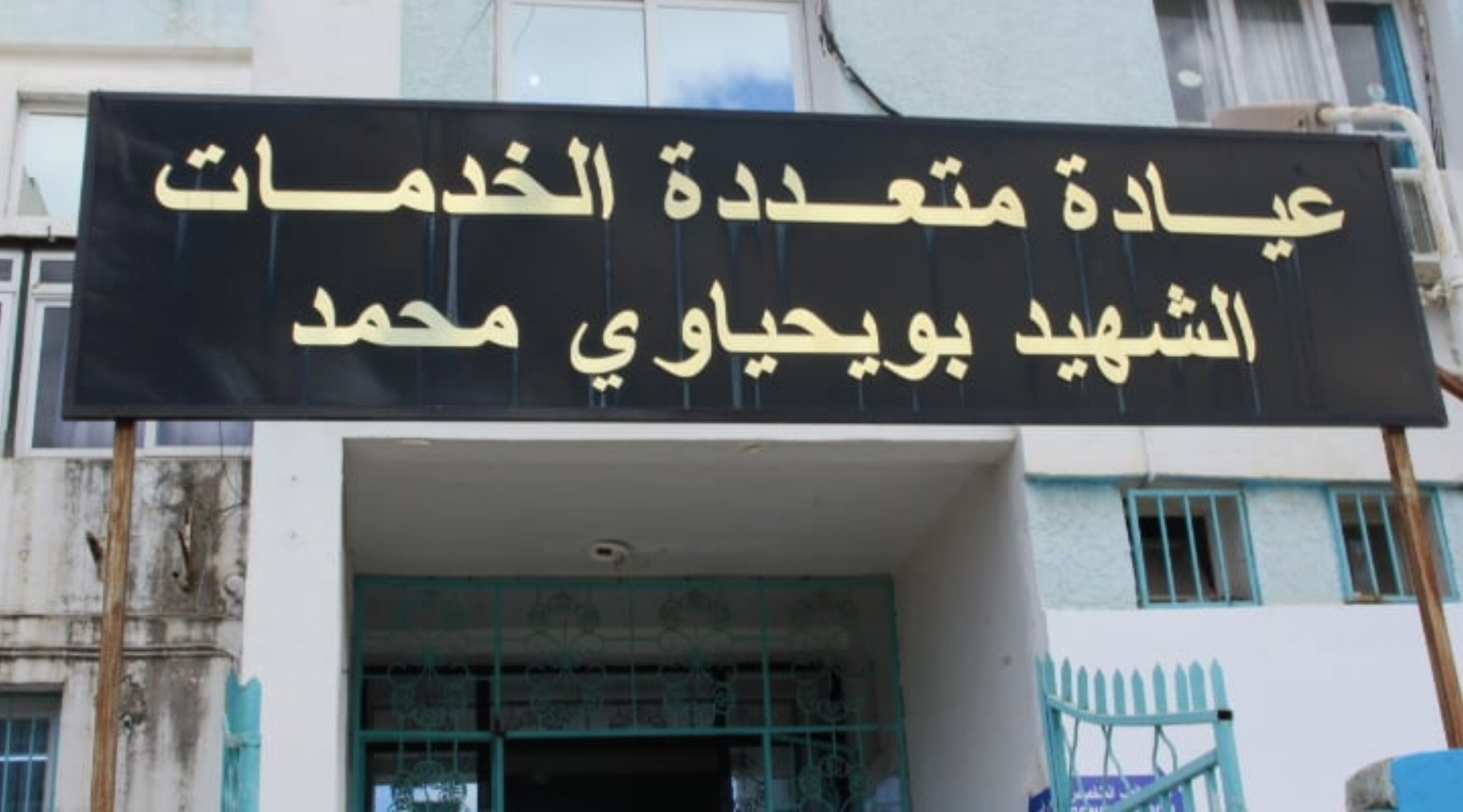
Mohamed Bouyahiaoui Hospital

- Mohamed Bouyahiaoui Hospital

== Sport ==
Club	Division	Level	Location
RC Boumerdes	Ligue de Football de la Wilaya	3	Boumerdès
WR Tidjelabine	Ligue de Football de la Wilaya	3	Tidjelabine
JS Boumerdes	Ligue de Football de la Wilaya	3	Boumerdès

== Notable people ==
- Cheikh Boumerdassi (1818–1874)
- Brahim Boushaki (1912–1997)
- Mohamed Boumerdassi (1936–2010)
- Ali Bouyahiaoui (1928–1956)
- Mohamed Bouyahiaoui (1932–1958)
- Adel Djerrar (born 1990)
- Mohamed Flissi (born 1990)
- Ali Laskri (born 1955)
- Ahmed Mahsas (1923–2013)
