= Tidjelabine (disambiguation) =

Tidjelabine is a commune in Boumerdès Province within Algeria.

It may also refer to:

- 2005 Tidjelabine bombing, a terrorist attack in Algeria.
- 2006 Tidjelabine bombing, a terrorist attack in Algeria.
- 2010 Tidjelabine bombing, a terrorist attack in Algeria.
