= Bouyahiaoui =

Bouyahiaoui may refer to:

== Places ==
- Ali Bouyahiaoui, neighbourhood in Algeria.
- Mohamed Bouyahiaoui Hospital, hospital in Algeria.

== People ==
- Noureddine Bouyahiaoui (born 1955), Moroccan footballer
