= Belhasnet =

- Nickname: Ouled Bel Hassenat
- Motto: بلحسنات
- Interactive map of Belhasnet
- Coordinates: 36.7123831°N 3.4711843°E
- Commune: Tidjelabine
- District: Boumerdès District
- Province: Boumerdès Province
- Region: Kabylie
- Country: Algeria

Area
  - Total: 3 km^{2} (1.2 sq mi)

Dimensions
  - Length: 2 km (1.2 mi)
  - Width: 1.5 km (0.93 mi)
- Elevation: 270 m (890 ft)
- Time zone: UTC+01:00
- Area code: 35021

Belhasnet or Ouled Bel Hassenat is a village in the Boumerdès Province in Kabylie, Algeria.

== Location ==
The village is surrounded by Meraldene River and Boumerdès River and the towns of Thénia and Tidjelabine in the Khachna mountain range.

== Notable people ==
- Ali Bouyahiaoui, an Algerian militant.
- Mohamed Bouyahiaoui, an Algerian militant.
