= Sidi Yahia, Boumerdès =

Sidi Yahia
- Motto: سيدي يحي
- Interactive map of Sidi Yahia
- Coordinates: 36.7508644°N 3.5072905°E
- Commune: Tidjelabine
- District: Boumerdès District
- Province: Boumerdès Province
- Region: Kabylie
- Country: Algeria

Area
  - Total: 4.4 km^{2} (1.7 sq mi)

Dimensions
  - Length: 2 km (1.2 mi)
  - Width: 2.2 km (1.4 mi)
- Elevation: 140 m (460 ft)
- Time zone: UTC+01:00
- Area code: 35021

Sidi Yahia is a village in the Boumerdès Province in Kabylie, Algeria.

== Location ==
The village is surrounded by Meraldene River and Boumerdès River and the towns of Thénia and Tidjelabine in the Khachna mountain range.
