= Berreghlou =

- Motto: برغلو
- Interactive map of Berreghlou
- Coordinates: 36.7095763°N 3.5122488°E
- Commune: Tidjelabine
- District: Boumerdès District
- Province: Boumerdès Province
- Region: Kabylie
- Country: Algeria Algeria

Area
  - Total: 2.8 km^{2} (1.1 sq mi)

Dimensions
  - Length: 2 km (1.2 mi)
  - Width: 1.4 km (0.87 mi)
- Elevation: 480 m (1,570 ft)
- Time zone: UTC+01:00
- Area code: 35021

Berreghlou is a village in the Boumerdès Province in Kabylie, Algeria.

== Location ==
The village is surrounded by Meraldene River and Boumerdès River and the towns of Thénia and Tidjelabine in the Khachna mountain range.
