= Ahl El Oued =

- Motto: أهل الوادي
- Interactive map of Ahl El Oued
- Coordinates: 36.7211782°N 3.5093614°E
- Commune: Tidjelabine
- District: Boumerdès District
- Province: Boumerdès Province
- Region: Kabylie
- Country: Algeria Algeria

Area
  - Total: 4 km^{2} (1.5 sq mi)

Dimensions
  - Length: 2 km (1.2 mi)
  - Width: 2 km (1.2 mi)
- Elevation: 240 m (790 ft)
- Time zone: UTC+01:00
- Area code: 35021

Ahl El Oued is a village in the Boumerdès Province in Kabylie, Algeria.

== Location ==
The village is surrounded by Meraldene River and Boumerdès River and the towns of Thénia and Tidjelabine in the Khachna mountain range.
