= Boumerdès =

Boumerdes Bumerdas
- City
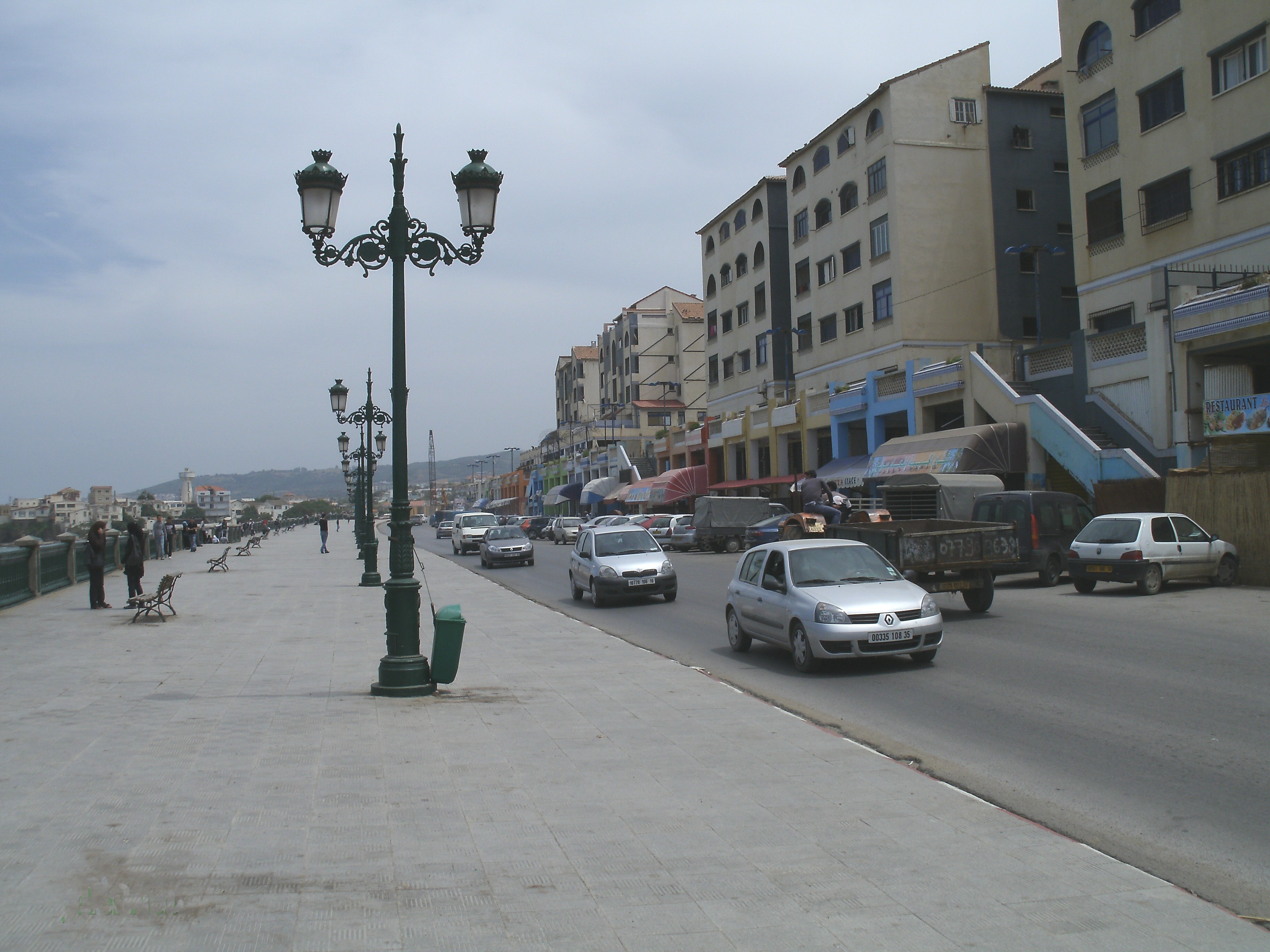

- Location within Algeria
- Coordinates: 36°45′37.23″N 3°28′20.52″E
- Country: Algeria
- Province: Boumerdès Province
- District: Boumerdes District
- Elevation: 50 m (160 ft)

Population (2008)
  - Total: 41 685
- Time zone: UTC+1 (CET)
- Climate: Csa

Boumerdès (Kabyle: Bumerdas, Arabic: بومرداس; formerly Rocher Noir) is the capital city of Boumerdès Province, Algeria. It is located on the Mediterranean Sea. It had a population of 15,000 in 1987 and 28,500 in 1998.

Boumerdès is a seaside city located in the north of Algeria about 50 km east of Algiers and 50 km west of Tizi Ouzou. During French occupation of Algeria, the city was named Rocher Noir, translated from French as Black Rock. The city became the capital of the province, having the same name, according to the administrative division in 1984.

It is the capital city of wilaya (province) of Boumerdès. The city is famous as a scientific center, including a number of national institutes and the University of M'hamed Bouguerra. The institutes include l'Institut Algérien du Pétrole (the Algerian Petroleum Institute IAP), Faculté des Hydrocarbures et de la Chimie (Faculty of Hydrocarbons and Chemistry FHC), l'Institut National d'Électricité et d'Électronique (The National Institute for Electricity and Electronics INELEC), l'Institut National de Génie mécanique (The National Institute of Mechanical Engineering ENGM), l'Institut National des Industries légères (The National Institute for Light Industries INIL).

The city is also known as an industrial center containing the headquarters of Sonatrach Exploration, l'Entreprise Nationale de Géophysique (ENAGEO), and le Centre de Recherches et de Développement (Research and Development Center for Sonatrach CRD).

In 2003, a devastating 6.8 magnitude earthquake shook northern Algeria with a maximum Mercalli intensity of X (Extreme). The city was one of the most heavily hit places. In total, more than 2,200 people were killed, over 10,000 were injured, and a moderate tsunami damaged boats at the Balearic Islands.

== Climate ==
Climate data for Boumerdés
Month	Jan	Feb	Mar	Apr	May	Jun	Jul	Aug	Sep	Oct	Nov	Dec	Year
Mean daily maximum °C (°F)	14.5 (58.1)	14.8 (58.6)	17.6 (63.7)	20.2 (68.4)	23.7 (74.7)	28.8 (83.8)	32.6 (90.7)	32.8 (91.0)	29.0 (84.2)	25.5 (77.9)	18.8 (65.8)	15.5 (59.9)	22.8 (73.1)
Daily mean °C (°F)	9.8 (49.6)	10.0 (50.0)	12.5 (54.5)	15.0 (59.0)	18.4 (65.1)	22.9 (73.2)	26.4 (79.5)	26.6 (79.9)	23.3 (73.9)	19.9 (67.8)	14.1 (57.4)	11.0 (51.8)	17.5 (63.5)
Mean daily minimum °C (°F)	5.9 (42.6)	5.8 (42.4)	7.8 (46.0)	9.9 (49.8)	12.9 (55.2)	16.8 (62.2)	20.0 (68.0)	20.8 (69.4)	18.3 (64.9)	15.2 (59.4)	10.4 (50.7)	7.3 (45.1)	12.6 (54.6)
Average precipitation mm (inches)	94 (3.7)	79 (3.1)	74 (2.9)	69 (2.7)	53 (2.1)	9 (0.4)	2 (0.1)	9 (0.4)	34 (1.3)	61 (2.4)	96 (3.8)	92 (3.6)	672 (26.5)
Average precipitation days	9	8	7	7	5	2	1	1	5	6	9	8	68
Average relative humidity (%)	75	73	72	71	69	59	54	56	63	64	71	74	67
Source: Climate data.org(1991-2021)

== Neighbourhoods ==
The neighbourhoods of Boumerdès are:

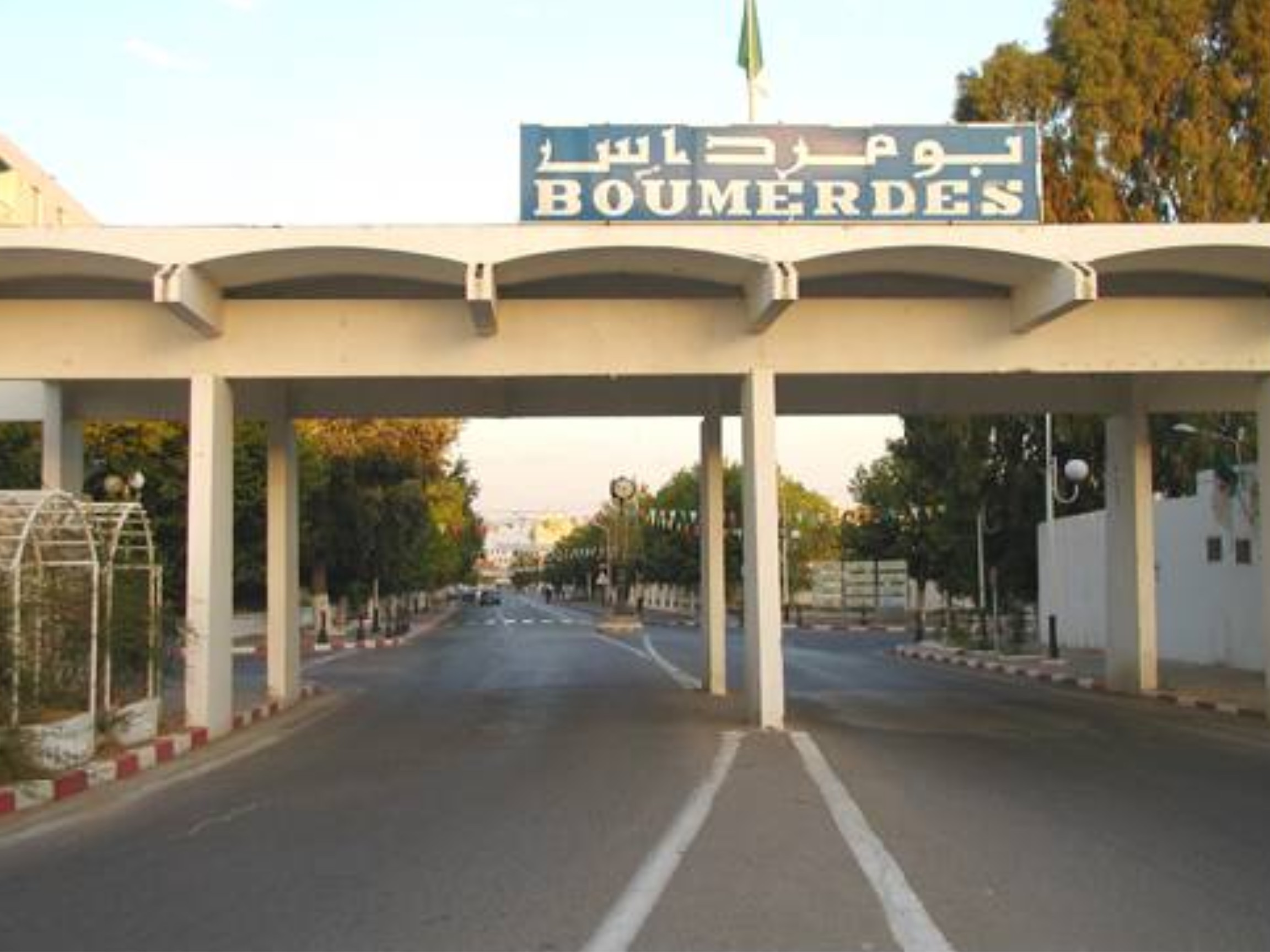
Cité Ali Bouyahiaoui

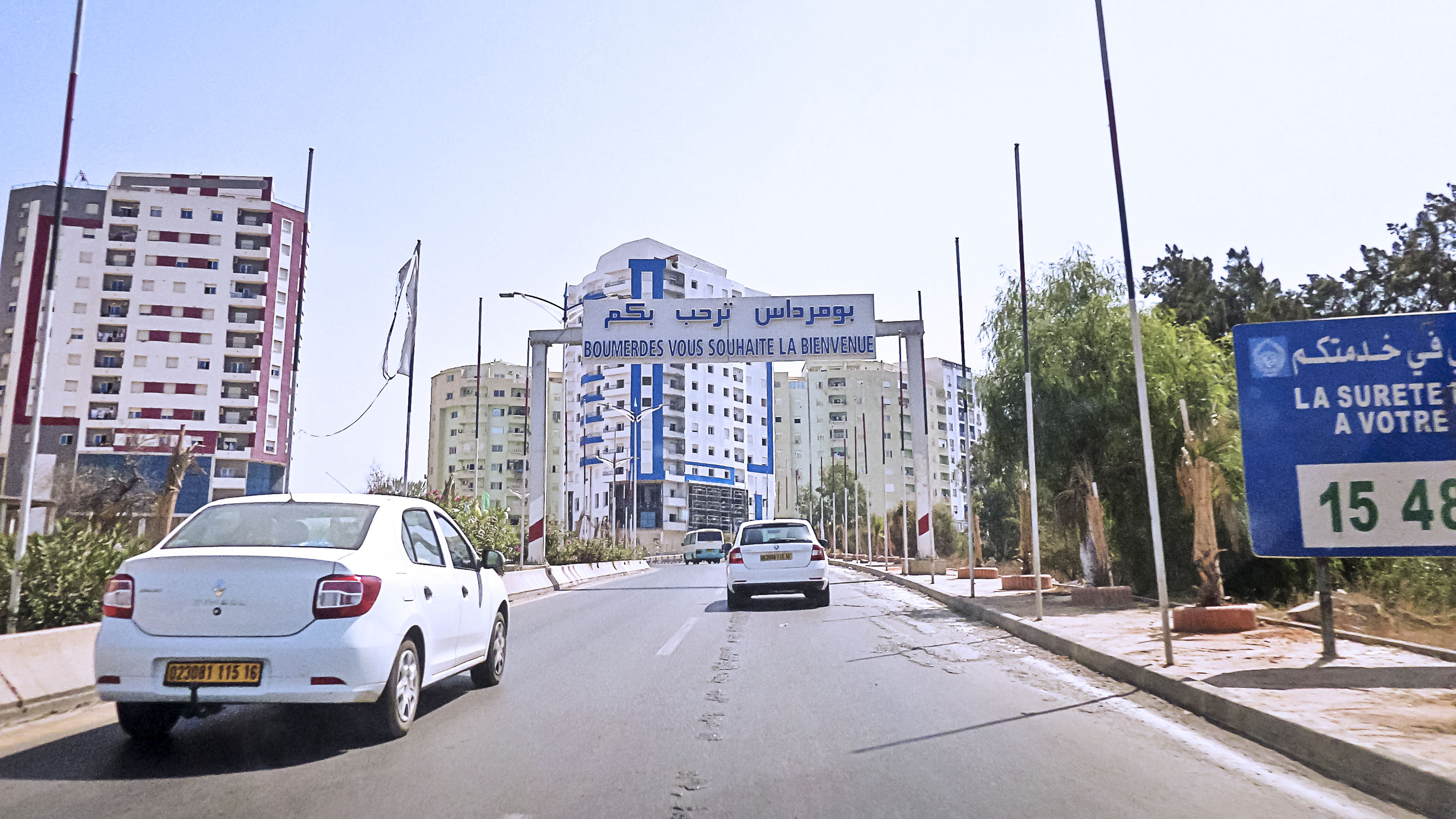
Cité 11 décembre 1960

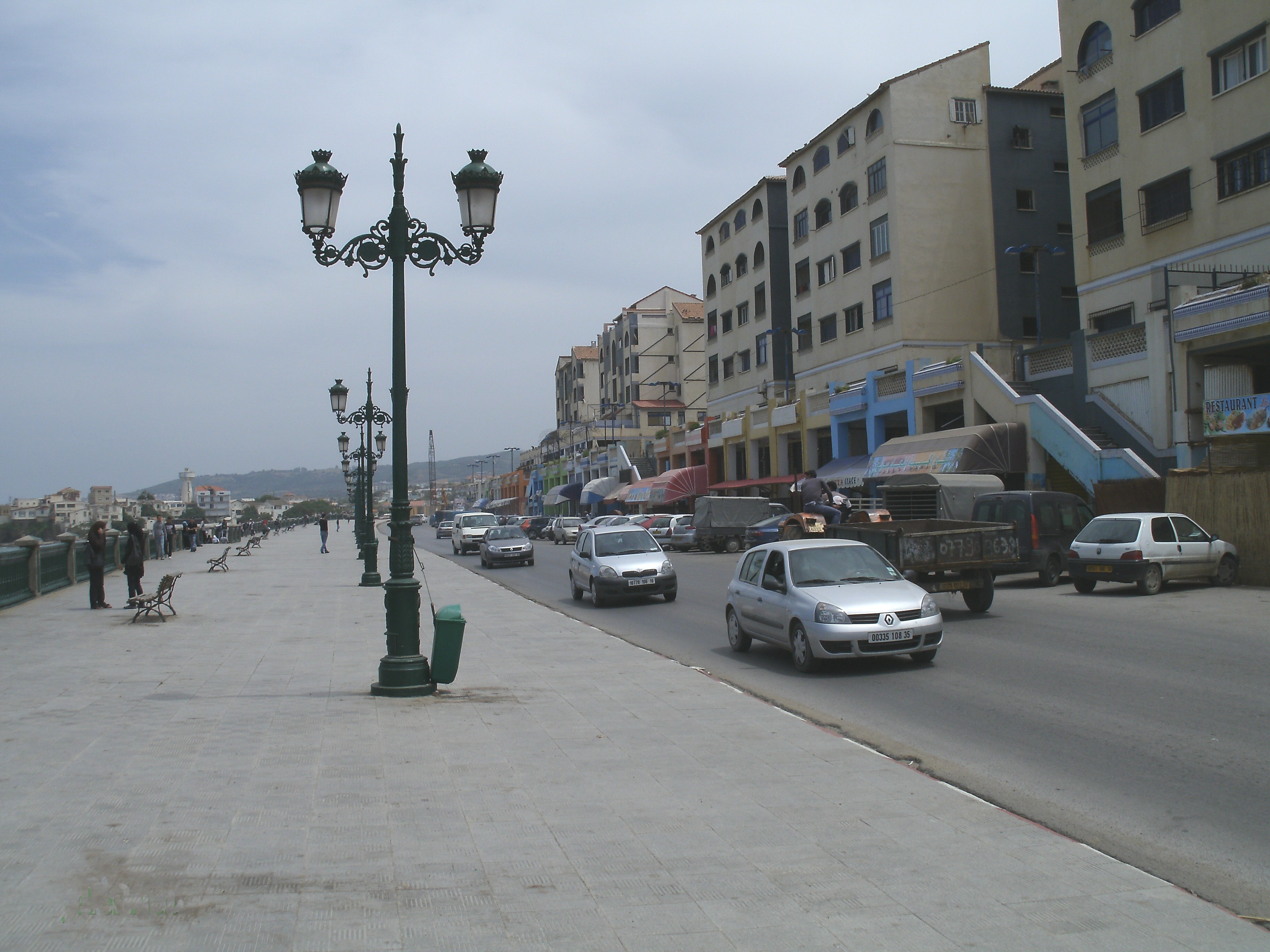
Quartier du front de mer

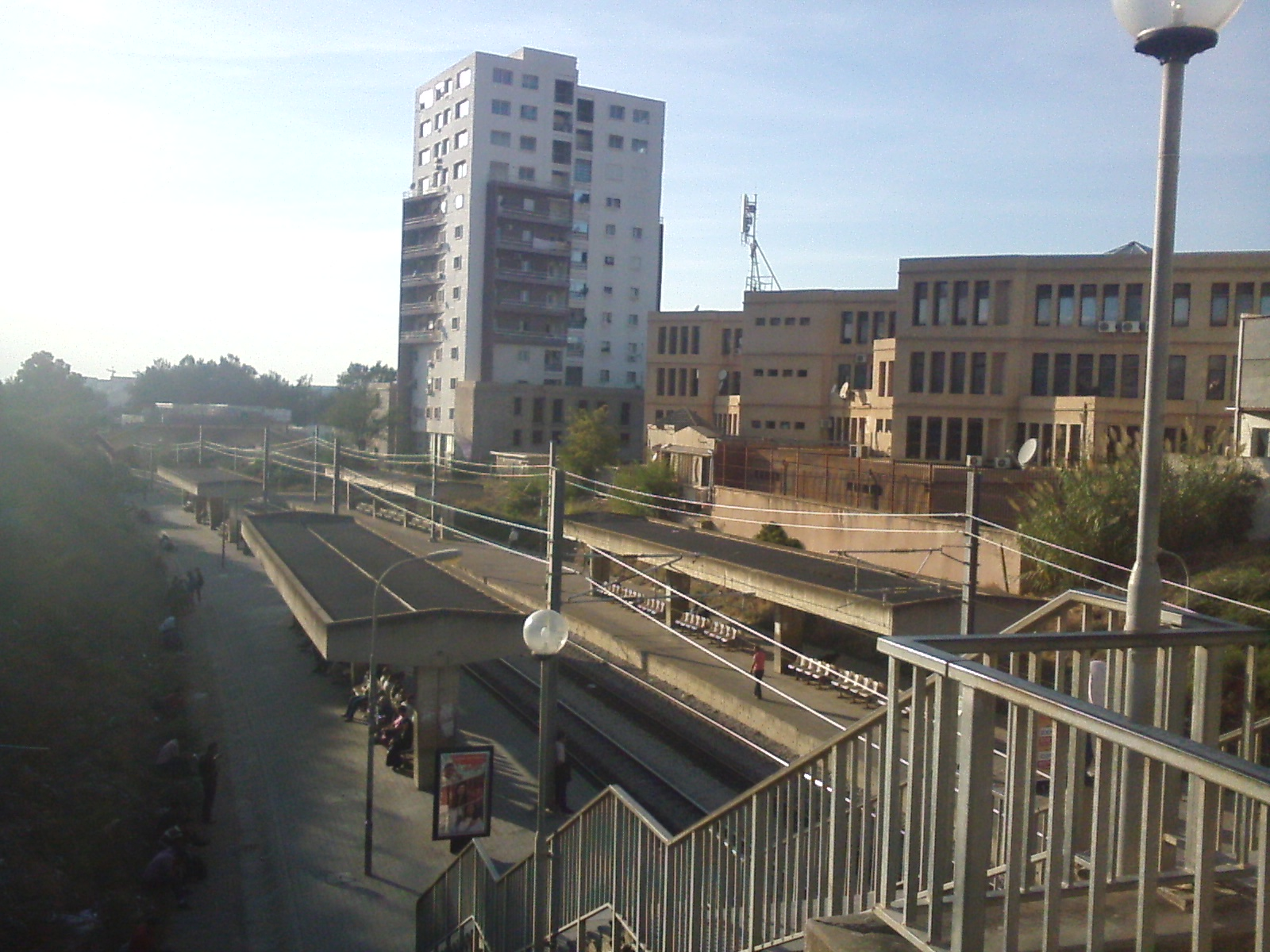
Cité Ibn Khaldoun

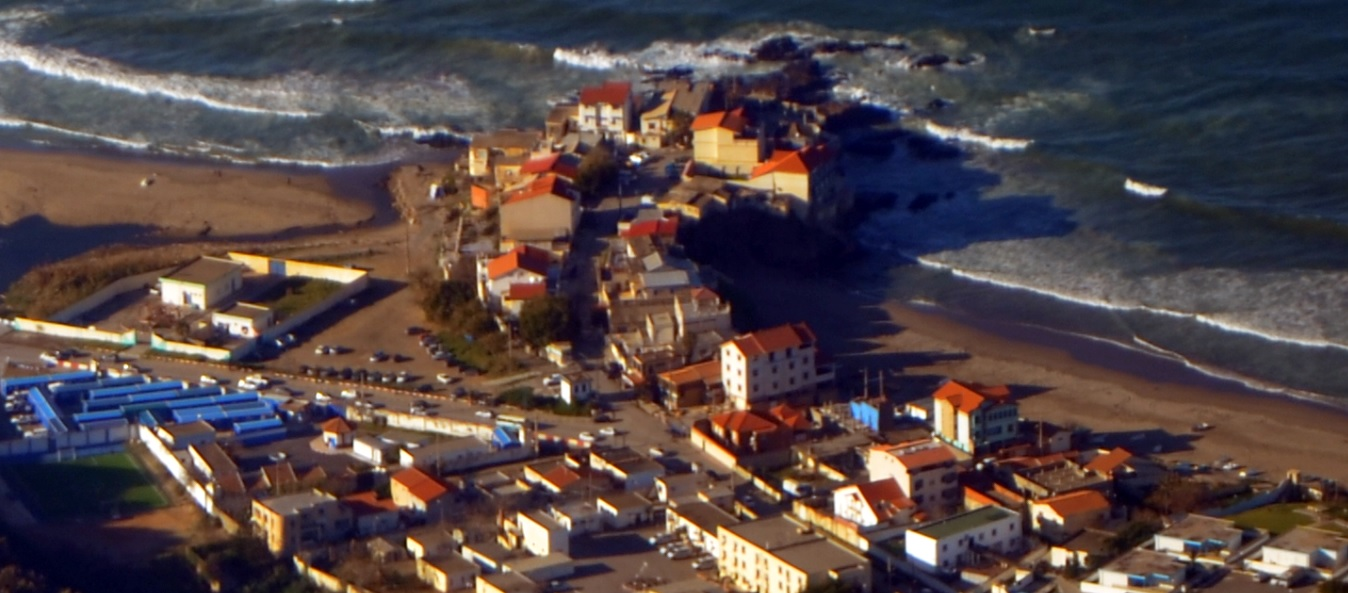
Cité du Rocher Noir

== Rivers ==
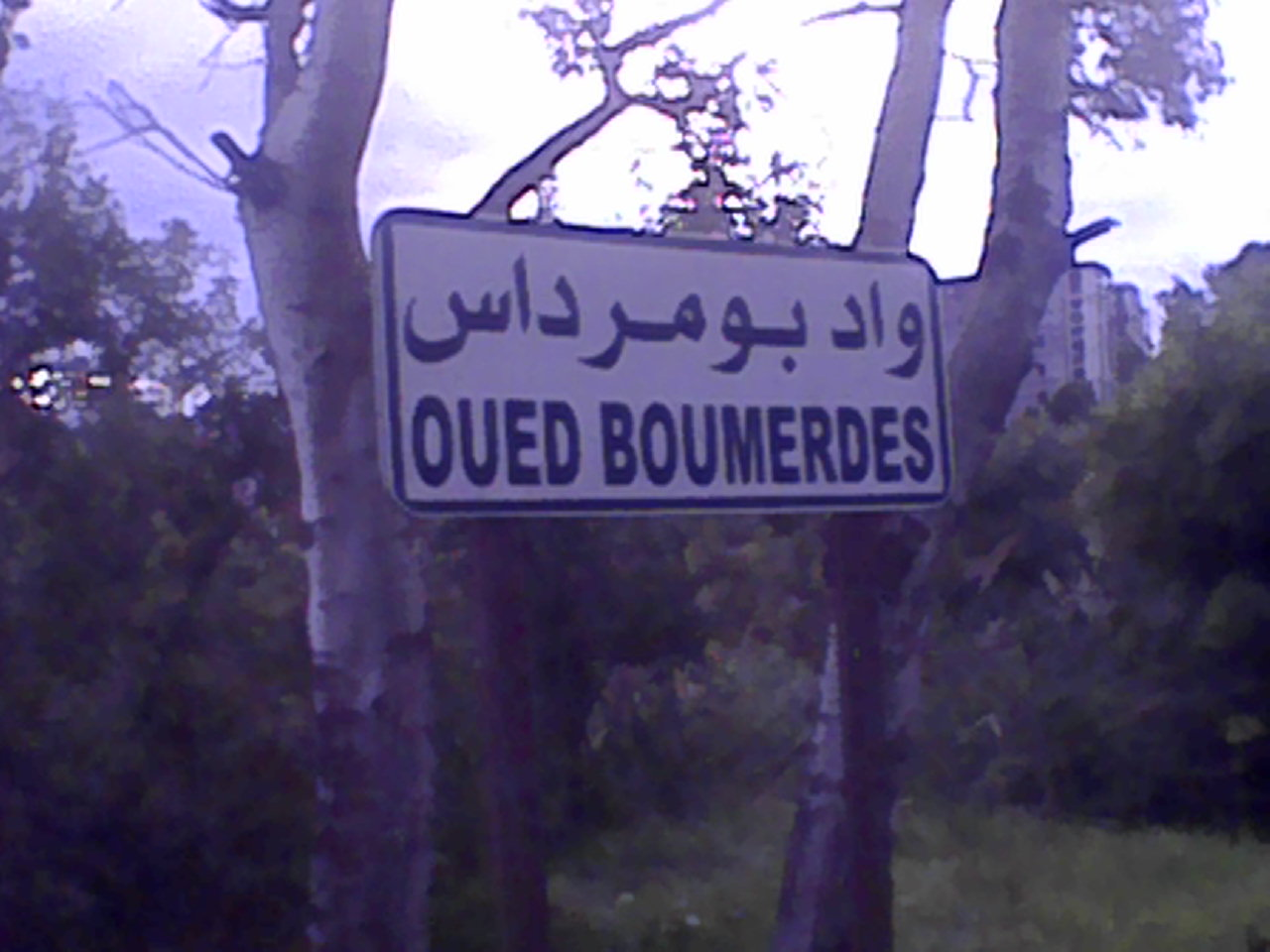
Boumerdès River

This commune is crossed by several rivers:

- Meraldene River
- Beni Arab River
- Boumerdès River
- Corso River
- El Karma River
- Sidi Ali River
- Tatarig River

== Geology ==
Several mountain peaks are found in this commune:

- Bouarous Mount (444 m)
- Cap Blanc Mount (420 m)

== History ==
- First Battle of the Issers (1837)

== Health ==
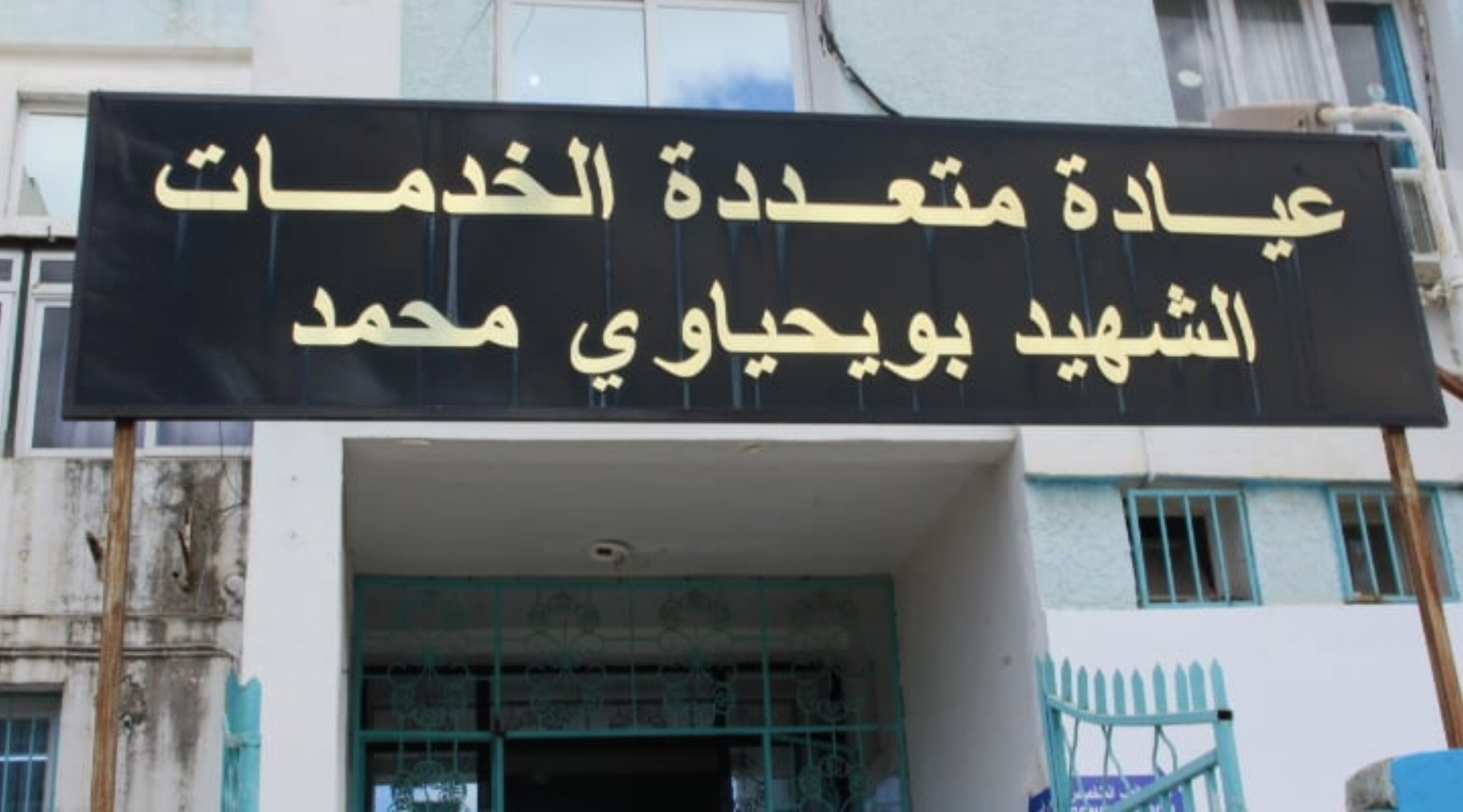
Mohamed Bouyahiaoui Hospital

- Mohamed Bouyahiaoui Hospital

== Sport ==
Club	Division	Level	Location
JS Boumerdes	Inter-Régions Division	3	Boumerdès
RC Boumerdes	Régionale II	5	Boumerdès

== Notable people ==
- Brahim Boushaki, Algerian theologian
- Adel Djerrar, Algerian footballer
- Mohamed Flissi, Algerian boxer
- Ali Laskri, Algerian politician
- Hassiba Boumerdassi, Algerian lawyer
- Samia Boumerdassi, Algerian artist
- Selma Boumerdassi, Algerian academic
