= Tidjelabine =

- Commune and town
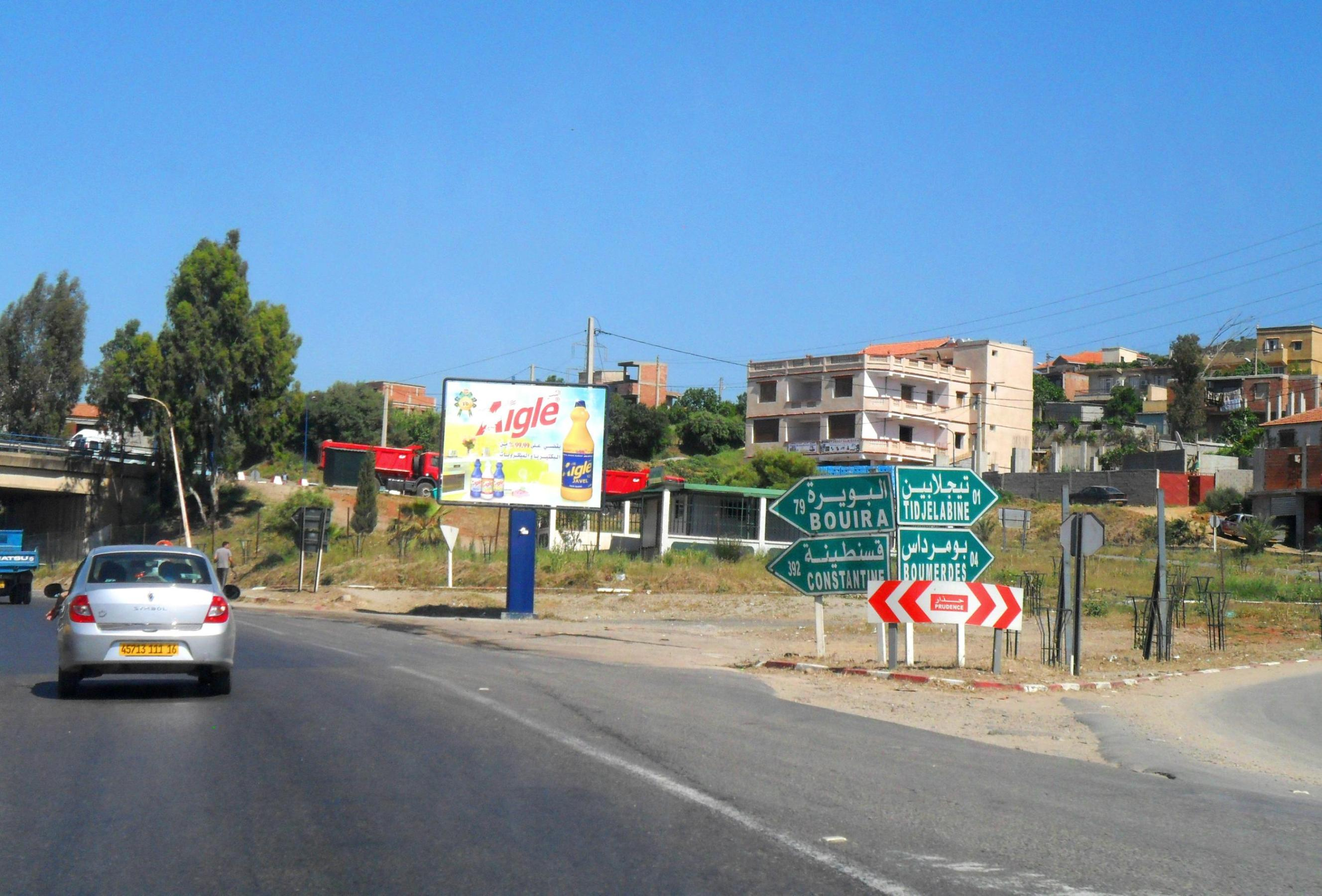
- RN 5 in Tidjelabine

- Location within Algeria
- Coordinates: 36°44′N 3°30′E
- Country: Algeria
- Province: Boumerdès Province

Population (1998)
  - Total: 13,888
- Time zone: UTC+1 (CET)

Tidjelabine is a town and commune in Boumerdès Province, Algeria. According to the 1998 census it has a population of 13,888.

== Villages ==
The villages of the commune of Tidjelabine are:

- A
  - Ahl El Koudia
  - Ahl El Oued
- B
  - Belhasnet
  - Beni Fouda
  - Berreghlou
- M
  - Mahsas
  - Medjber
  - Meraïel
- O
  - Ouled Boumerdès
- S
  - Sidi Yahia

== Religion ==
- Zawiyet Sidi Boumerdassi

== History ==
=== French conquest ===
- Expedition of the Col des Beni Aïcha (1837)
- First Battle of the Issers (1837)

=== Salafist terrorism ===
- 2005 Tidjelabine bombing (29 July 2005)
- 2006 Tidjelabine bombing (19 June 2006)
- 2010 Tidjelabine bombing (7 April 2010)

== Sport ==
Club	Division	Level	Location	Logo
WR Tidjelabine	Ligue de Football de la Wilaya	3	Tidjelabine	

== Notable people ==
- Cheikh Boumerdassi (1818–1874)
- Mohamed Boumerdassi (1936–2010)
- Ali Bouyahiaoui (1928–1956)
- Mohamed Bouyahiaoui (1932–1958)
- Ahmed Mahsas (1923–2013)
