= Medjber =

- Motto: مجبر
- Interactive map of Medjber
- Coordinates: 36.7043293°N 3.4931596°E
- Commune: Tidjelabine
- District: Boumerdès District
- Province: Boumerdès Province
- Region: Kabylie
- Country: Algeria Algeria

Area
  - Total: 2.6 km^{2} (1.0 sq mi)

Dimensions
  - Length: 2 km (1.2 mi)
  - Width: 1.3 km (0.81 mi)
- Elevation: 510 m (1,670 ft)
- Time zone: UTC+01:00
- Area code: 35021

Medjber is a village in the Boumerdès Province in Kabylie, Algeria.

== Location ==
The village is surrounded by Meraldene River and Boumerdès River and the towns of Thénia and Tidjelabine in the Khachna mountain range.
