= Beni Fouda, Boumerdès =

Beni Fouda
- Motto: بني فودة
- Interactive map of Beni Fouda
- Coordinates: 36.713912°N 3.4892953°E
- Commune: Tidjelabine
- District: Boumerdès District
- Province: Boumerdès Province
- Region: Kabylie
- Country: Algeria Algeria

Area
  - Total: 3.6 km^{2} (1.4 sq mi)

Dimensions
  - Length: 2 km (1.2 mi)
  - Width: 1.8 km (1.1 mi)
- Elevation: 380 m (1,250 ft)
- Time zone: UTC+01:00
- Area code: 35021

Beni Fouda is a village that is located in the Boumerdès Province in Kabylie, Algeria.

== Location ==
The village is surrounded by Meraldene River and Boumerdès River and the towns of Thénia and Tidjelabine in the Khachna mountain range.
