= 2005 Tidjelabine bombing =

Bombing occurred on July 29, 2005 in Algeria

Coordinates: 36.7263694°N 3.4998559°E

- Boumerdès Province highlighted within Algeria
- Location: (Algeria) Tidjelabine, Boumerdès Province
- Date: July 29, 2005
- Attack type: Car bomb
- Deaths: 2
- Injuries: 4
- Perpetrator: Al-Qaeda Organization in the Islamic Maghreb (suspected)

The 2005 Tidjelabine bombing occurred on July 29, 2005, when an explosive bomb detonated against a patrol of the Gendarmerie Nationale in the town of Tidjelabine, Boumerdès Province, Algeria killing 2 and injuring 4. The Al-Qaeda Organization in the Islamic Maghreb was suspected as being responsible.

== See also ==
- Terrorist bombings in Algeria
- List of terrorist incidents, 2005
