= 2006 Tidjelabine bombing =

Bombing occurred on June 19, 2006 in Algeria

Coordinates: 36.7196704°N 3.4875°E

- Boumerdès Province highlighted within Algeria
- Location: (Algeria) Tidjelabine, Boumerdès Province
- Date: June 19, 2006
- Attack type: Bomb
- Injuries: 3

The 2006 Tidjelabine bombing occurred on June 19, 2006, when an explosive bomb detonated against a patrol of the Garde communale in the town of Tidjelabine, Boumerdès Province, Algeria injuring 3. The Al-Qaeda Organization in the Islamic Maghreb is suspected as being responsible.

== See also ==
- Terrorist bombings in Algeria
- List of terrorist incidents, 2006
