= 2010 Tidjelabine bombing =

Bombing occurred on April 7, 2010 in Algeria

Coordinates: 36.7209639°N 3.493112°E

- Boumerdès Province highlighted within Algeria
- Location: (Algeria) Tidjelabine, Boumerdès Province
- Date: April 7, 2010
- Attack type: Car bomb
- Deaths: 2
- Injuries: 5
- Perpetrator: Al-Qaeda Organization in the Islamic Maghreb

The 2010 Tidjelabine bombing occurred on April 7, 2010, when an explosive bomb detonated against a patrol of the Gendarmerie Nationale in the town of Tidjelabine, Boumerdès Province, Algeria killing 2 and injuring 5. The Al-Qaeda Organization in the Islamic Maghreb is suspected as being responsible.

== See also ==
- Terrorist bombings in Algeria
- List of terrorist incidents, 2010
