= Ali Bouyahiaoui =

Ali Bouyahiaoui Arabic: علي بويحياوي
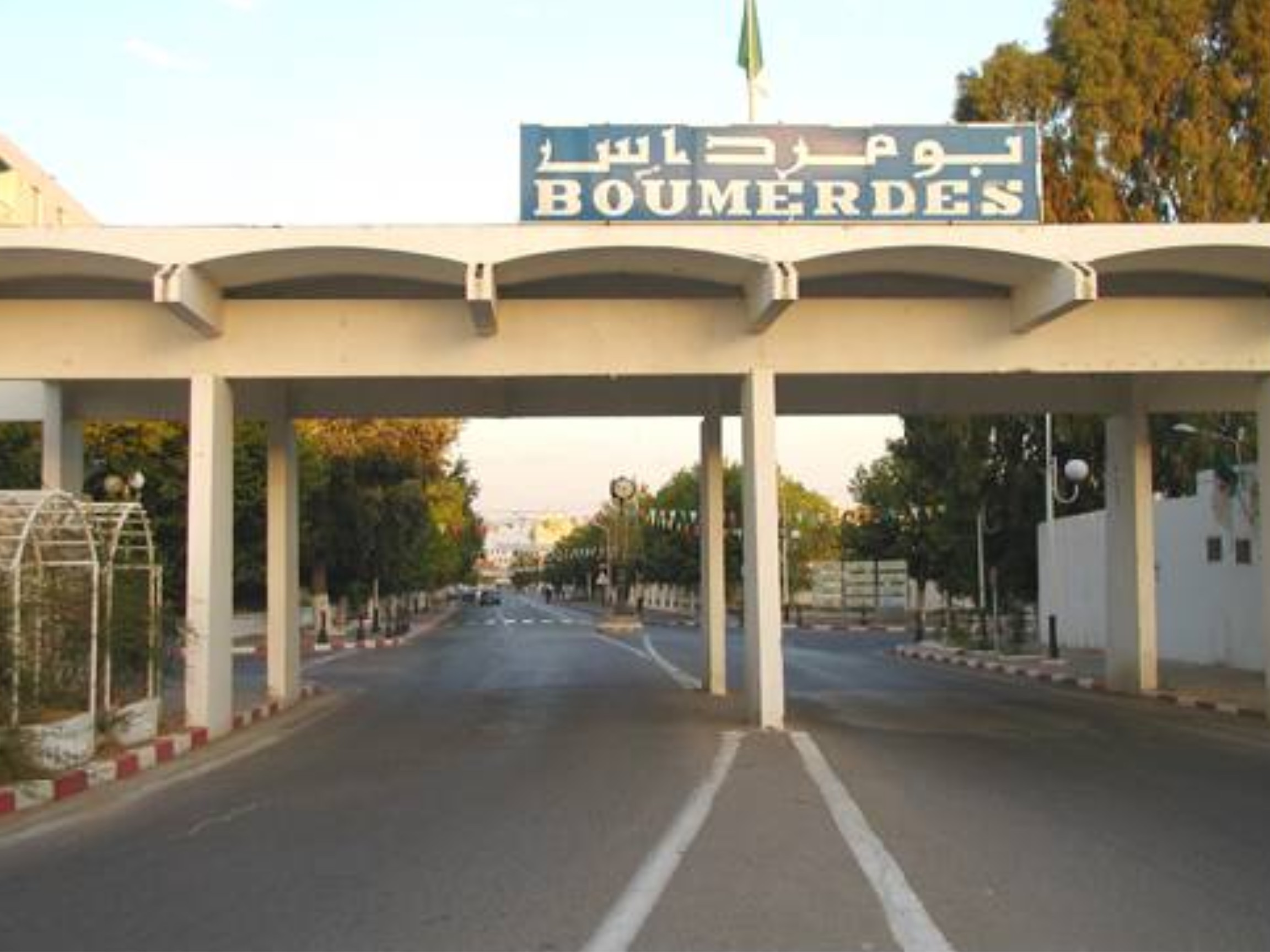
- Arabic: علي بويحياوي
- Interactive map of Ali Bouyahiaoui
- Coordinates: 36.755923°N 3.4791177°E
- Country: Algeria
- Province: Boumerdès Province
- District: Boumerdès District
- Commune: Boumerdès
- Region: Kabylia

Ali Bouyahiaoui (Arabic: علي بويحياوي) is a residential, administrative and commercial neighbourhood located in the commune of Boumerdès in Kabylia.

== History ==
The neighbourhood was created by in 1978, as part of the development of the city of Boumerdès.

== Gallery ==
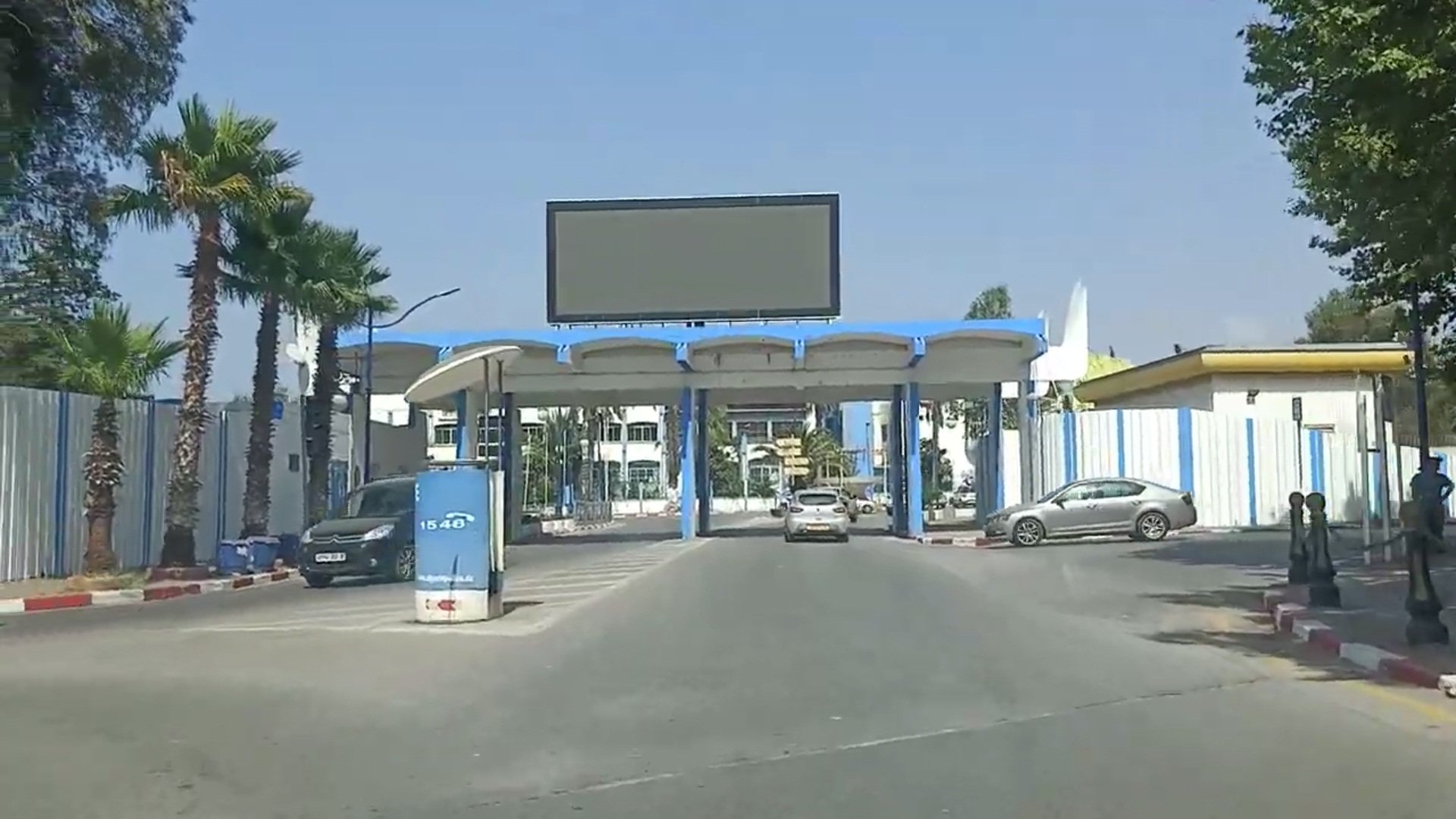
Ali Bouyahiaoui

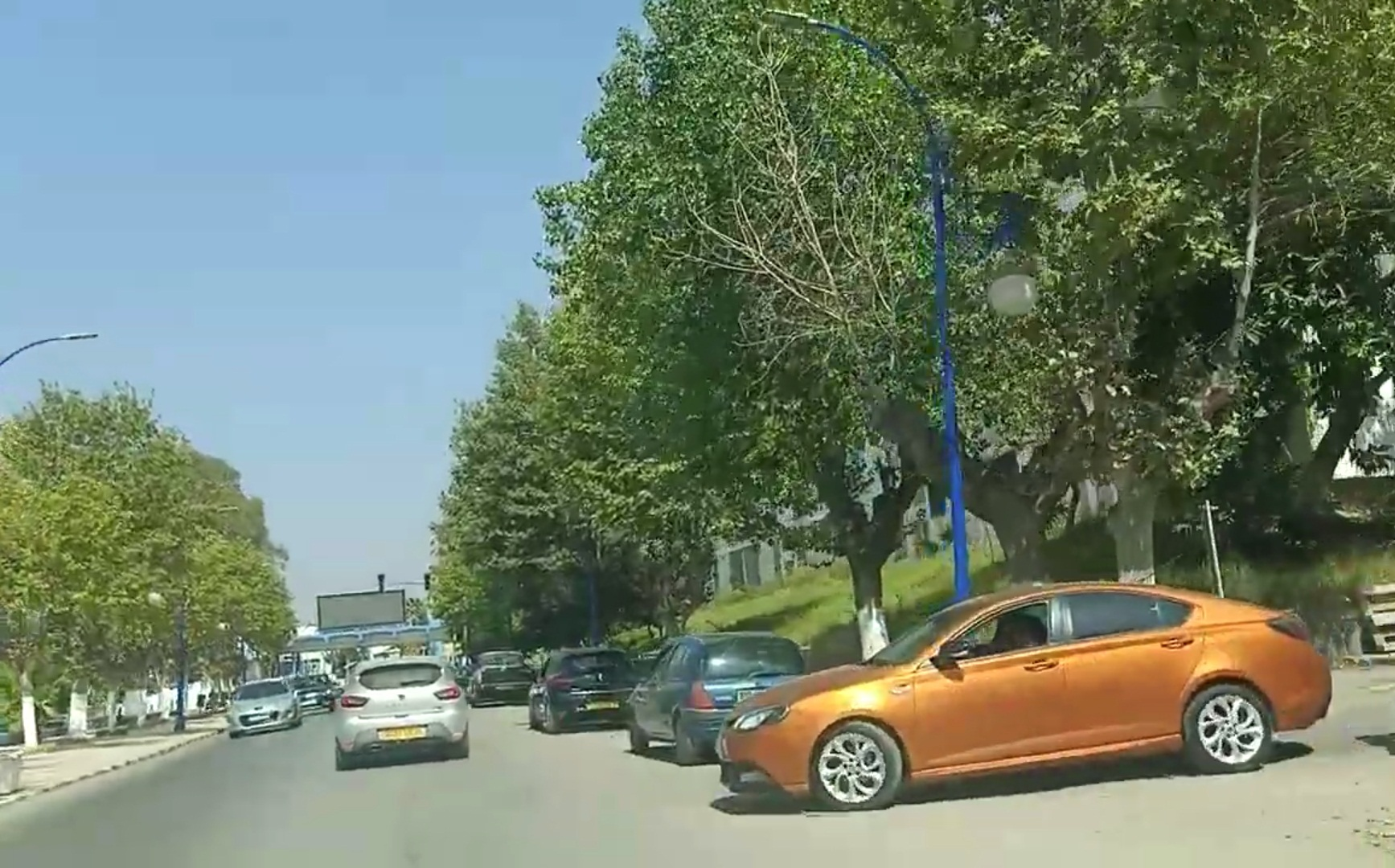
Ali Bouyahiaoui

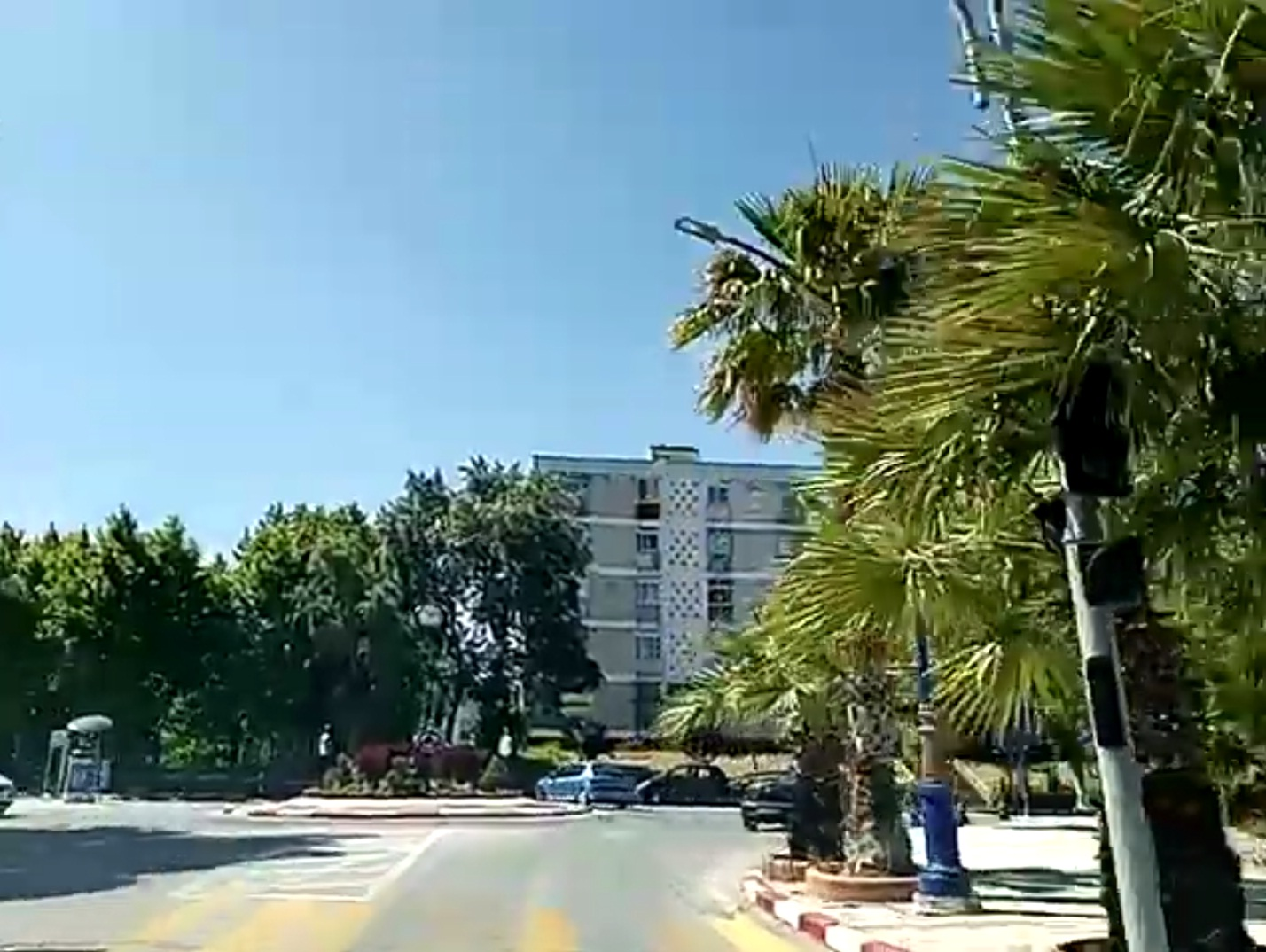
Ali Bouyahiaoui
