= Mohamed Bouyahiaoui Hospital =

- Ministry of Health in Algeria
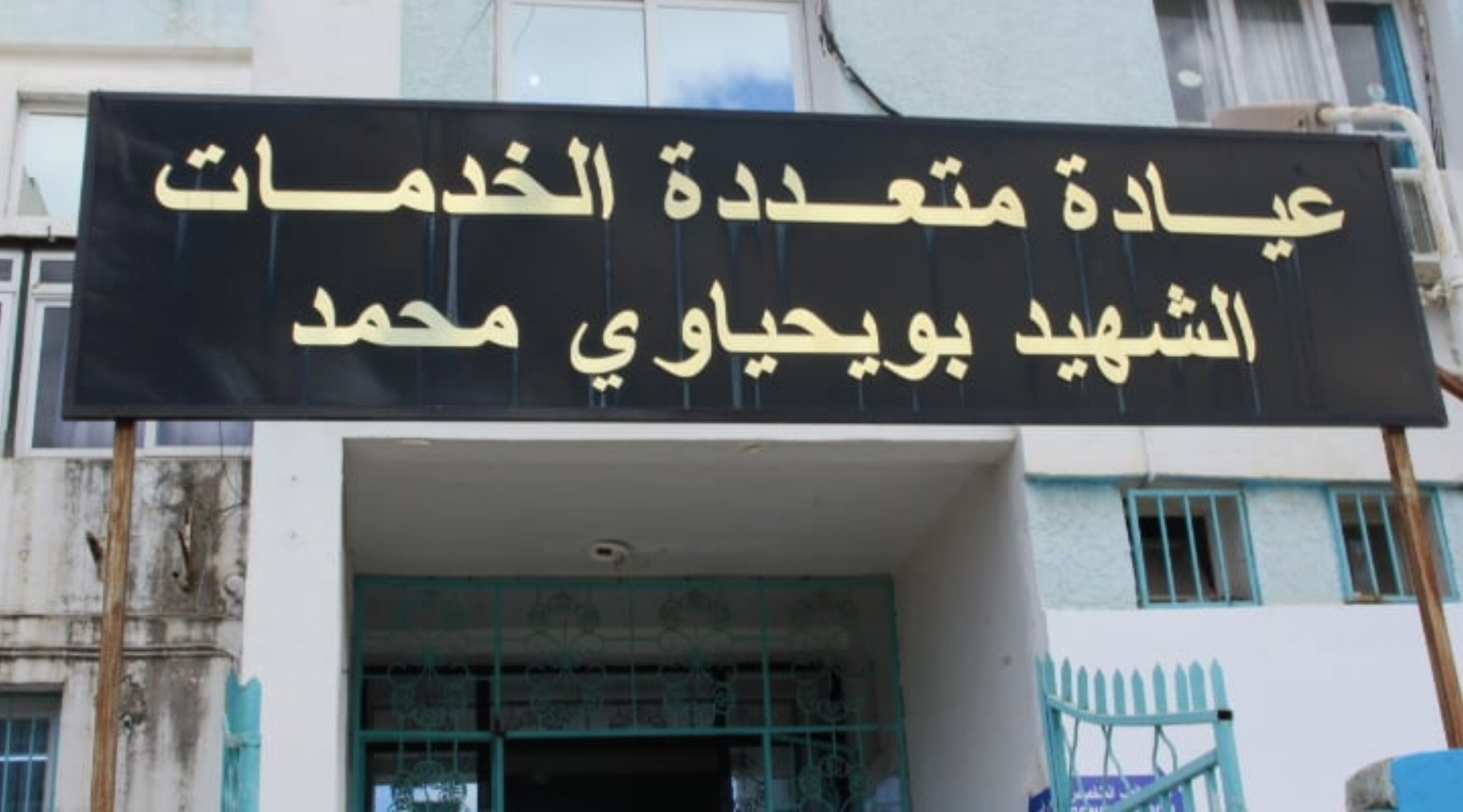
- Entrance to the hospital.

Geography
- Location: Boumerdès, Boumerdès Province, Algeria
- Coordinates: 36.7560313°N 3.4773427°E

Organisation
- Type: Hospital

History
- Founded: August 14, 1978

Mohamed Bouyahiaoui Hospital (Arabic: مستشفى محمد بويحياوي) was founded in 1978 in the town of Boumerdès and is the oldest hospital in this city.

This hospital center is affiliated with the Algerian Ministry of Health, Population and Hospital Reform.

== Services ==
The hospital provides the following services:

- Dermatology
- Emergency department
- Emergency medicine
- Family medicine
- Gynaecology
- Occupational medicine
- Pediatrics

== See also ==
- Ministry of Health, Population and Hospital Reform
- Health in Algeria
