= Ferme Gauthier =

Historical torture center in Algeria

Ferme Gautier
- "حوش قوتي" في "تيتونة" ضمن "سوق الحد"
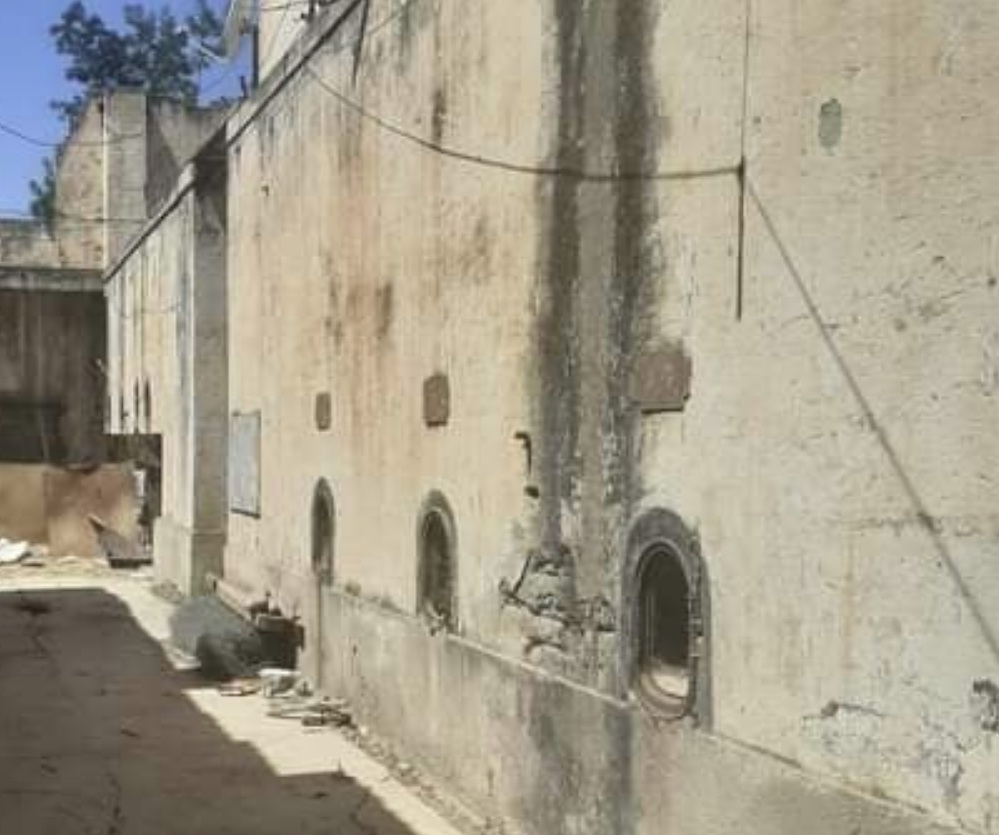
- Ferme Gautier
- Interactive map of Ferme Gautier
- Location: Titouna, Souk El Had, Boumerdès Province, Kabylia, Algeria
- Coordinates: 36.7076255°N 3.5928705°E
- Designer: Captain Scarfo; Charles Ailleret
- Type: Farm, Prison
- Material: concrete, steel, iron, stone, brick, wood
- Width: 60 metres (200 ft)
- Height: 66 metres (217 ft)
- Beginning date: 1872
- Completion date: 1873
- Opening date: 1873
- Dedicated to: Agriculture, Torture, Algeria War
- Website: www.m-moudjahidine.dz; Ministry of Mujahideen on Facebook

The Ferme Gautier is a torture center established during the Algerian war in the commune of Souk El Had in Kabylia within Algeria.

== Creation ==
This farm was created from 1872 when the farmer Gautier obtained an agricultural concession in Souk El Had after the spoliation and sequestration of land from local inhabitants after the end of the Mokrani Revolt.

== Agriculture ==
This farm specializes in viniculture by planting Grand Noir de la Calmette vineyards for the production of grape varieties oriented for the wine fermentation cellars within the farm and winemaking process.

The planting of vast orange groves to the north and east of the farm has made it possible to vary agricultural income while taking advantage of the abundance of water in Oued Isser.

== Algeria War ==
After the Algerian revolution passed the course of its outbreak, the year 1956 saw the intensification of the Algerian attacks against French infrastructures in Lower Kabylia.

This is how the villages of Souk El Had were supervised by the political commissar and moudjahid Yahia Boushaki (1935-1960), who managed to recruit dozens of activists committed to attack the colonial farms around Oued Isser.

The sabotage of colonial equipment bewildered, frustrated and frightened French farmers and townspeople, especially after the maquisarde cell leader Bouzid Boushaki (born 1935) planted a bomb in the post office in Thénia (old Ménerville).

All around the Beni Aïcha region, several farms were quickly transformed into clandestine torture centers supervised by settlers, Pieds-Noirs and French soldiers to try to quell the revolution.

== Reorganization ==
The Ferme Gauthier was transformed in 1956 into a closed prison building inside which there are narrow and closed concrete rooms, which the French converted from preserving and producing wine into terrible cells that witnessed the brutality of the practices of the French soldiers towards the Algerians who took up arms in the face of the occupation in order to regain freedom.

After the reconfiguration, the halls of forced detention, interrogation, torture and assassination inside this farm accommodated about 200 detainees in an area of not less than 5000 square meters of the original buildings of this facility.

Several trenches have been dug inside this detention center, and each hole does not exceed one or two meters in length and width, and from one to four detainees are dropped and placed in it, and the number may reach 8 or more.

The prison's open courtyard has been transformed into an open-air torture space, and it is impossible to allow meeting in it between prisoners except rarely, in the absence and lack of attention of the guards.

The torture center was equipped with three main doors, including a rear main door through which detainees who were sentenced to death were taken out, where they were taken to the nearby Isser River, where they were killed and buried or thrown into the flowing water stream.

The farm remained used in torture according to its modified structure, and thousands of Algerians were witnessing brutal operations, whether they were under the banner of the National Liberation Front (FLN), National Liberation Army (ALN) or among ordinary citizens, and this matter remained as such until the ceasefire was announced on 19 March 1962 after Évian Accords.

== Torture ==
This agricultural farm was transformed into a detention and torture center during the Algerian revolution, and the mujahideen were kidnapped and murdered there.

The executioners "Phénix" and "Scarfo" came from the Gauleiters with his collaborators "Mathieu" and "Lenfant", as well as other criminals from the "Mélives" of Si Mustapha and Zemmouri, and all had at their head in particular the executioners "Paternot" and "Reid".

After the independence of Algeria in 1962, the equipment used by the French colonial army when it tortured Algerian militants remained in place despite the occupation of the families who took up residence there.

This Gauthier concentration camp, as well as the various other camps, have never been listed by large international organizations such as the Red Cross, because they were clandestine and only the inhabitants of the neighborhood were aware of their existence.

The leaders of these places like Captains Scarfo, Lenfant and Mathieu were exfiltrated in March 1962, by order of General Charles Ailleret (1907-1968), and repatriated to France.

The author François Heintz wrote a book in 1982 on the details of the torture in the Gauthier Farm, and he titled it The harki of the red gendarmes 1954-1962 (French: Le harki des gendarmes rouges 1954-1962) where he cited the atrocities of the Captain Scarfo and his colleagues.

== Classification ==
This sinister Gautier farm is in the process of being classified by the Ministry of Mujahideen as a historical monument and transformed into a museum of the Historic Wilaya IV.

Indeed, this structure which was the biggest and the most cruel center of torture according to survivors, is today abandoned and threatens to collapse.

Contacts with the local authorities of the Boumerdès Province have been undertaken to relocate the families who are housed there and to rehabilitate the place as a museum and memorial of the Algerian revolution (1954-1962).

Indeed, this torture center of the Mujahideen must be protected and rehabilitated because it is part of the memory of the region of the Col des Beni Aïcha.

It was planned from 2016 that the families occupying the Gautier farm would be relocated, because these families live in very difficult conditions and their number continues to increase.

The relocation of the families of the Gautier torture center, infamous during the War of Liberation for having served as a concentration camp, will allow its recovery and its transformation into a museum or historical site in homage to the martyrs (Shuhada) who suffered the worst vicissitudes there.

== Location ==
This farm is located near the towns of Souk El Had, Thénia and Si Mustapha, and several adjoining villages, as well as Isser River and the RN5 National Road.

== Notable inmates ==
- Bouzid Boushaki (born 1935)
- Saïd Hafidh
- Lakhdar Kasraoui
- Mohamed Mechtir (born 1939)
- Mohamed Zemmouri (born 1937)
- M'Hamed Gourri
- Rabah Nassi (born 1934)
- Rabah Rahmoune (born 1940)

== Notable torturers ==
- Capitaine Scarfo
- Capitaine Phénix
- Capitaine Mathieu
- Capitaine Lenfant
- Georges Paternot
- Henry Dustou
- Georges Soler
- Jean Reid

== Gallery ==
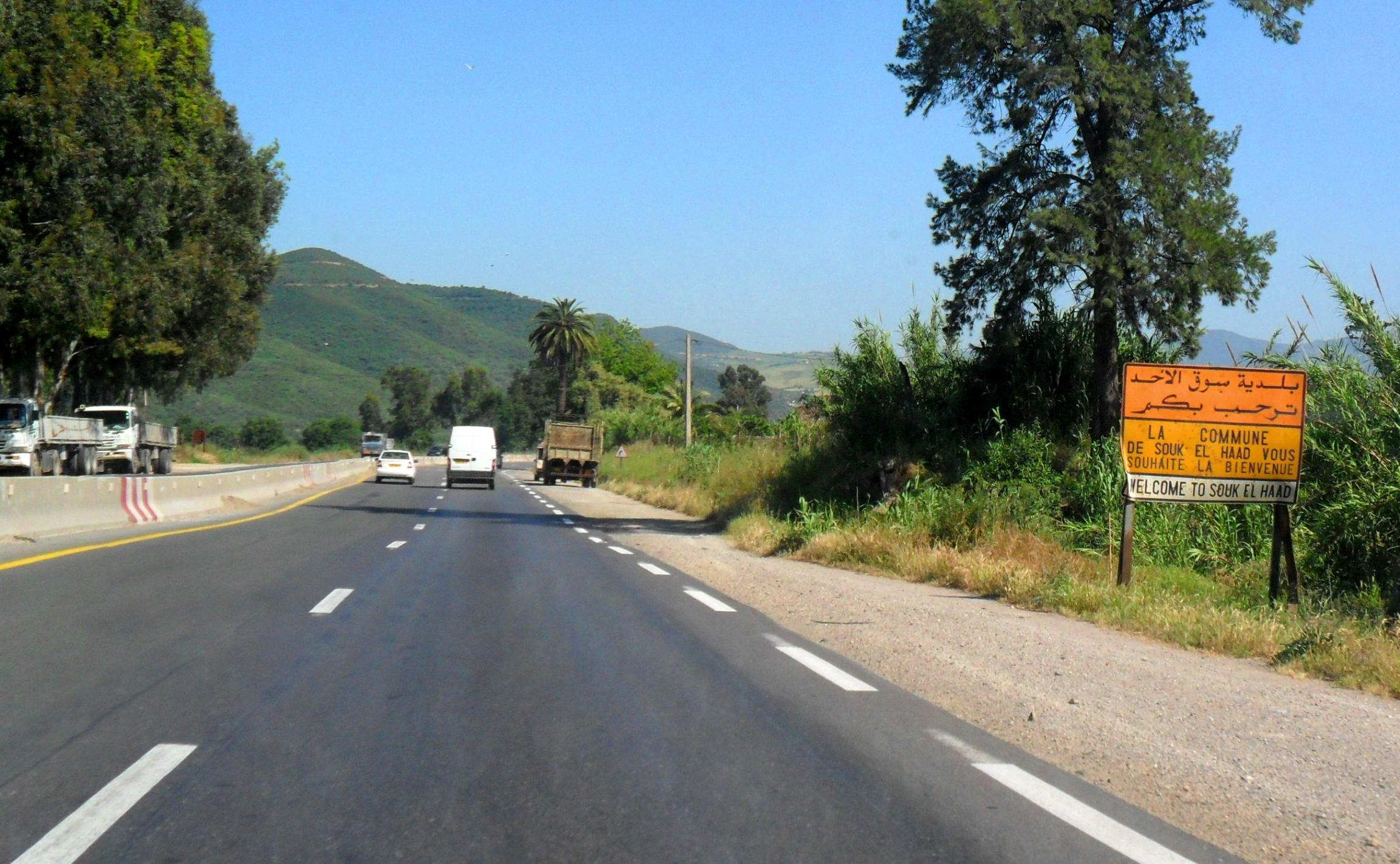
Titouna

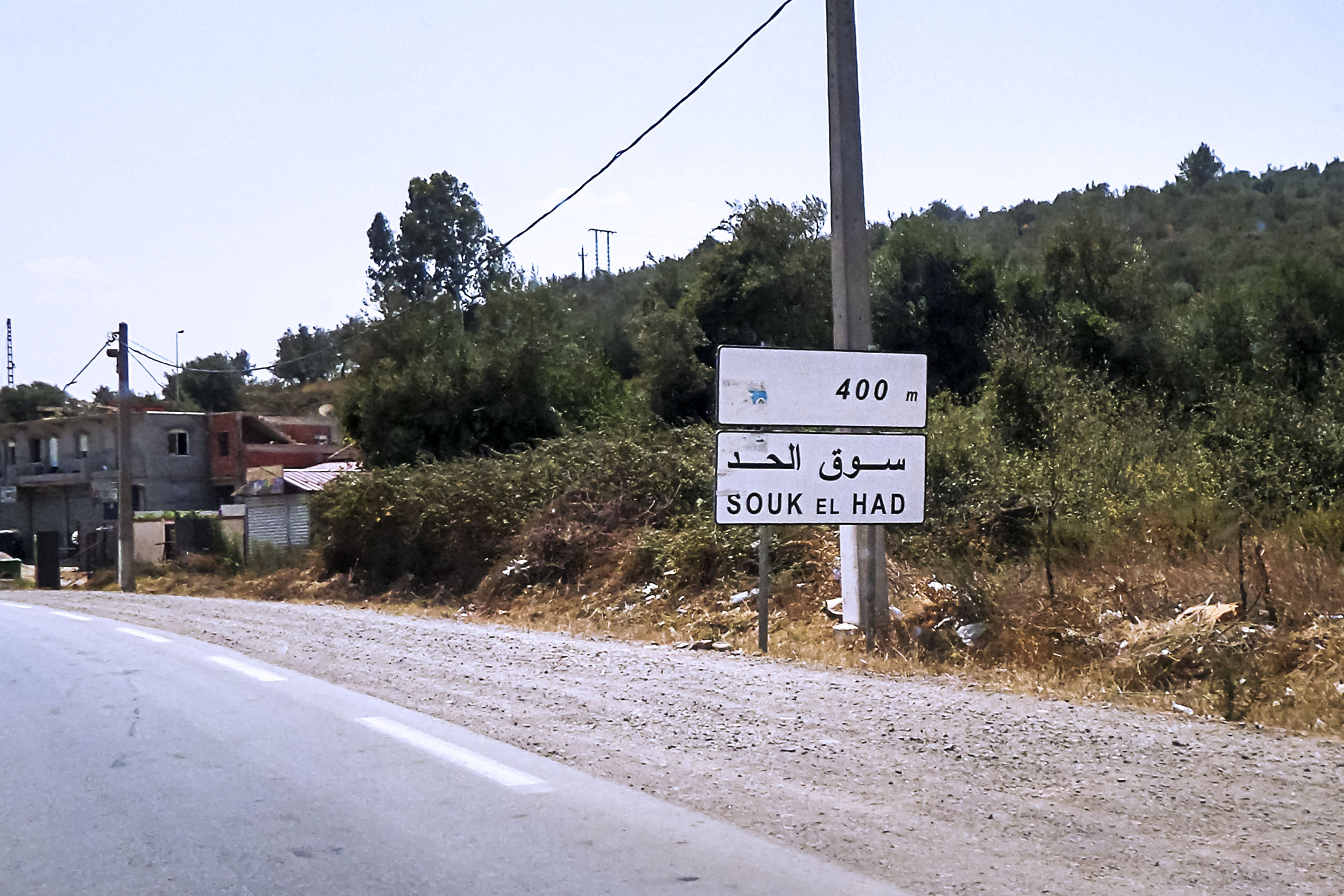
Titouna

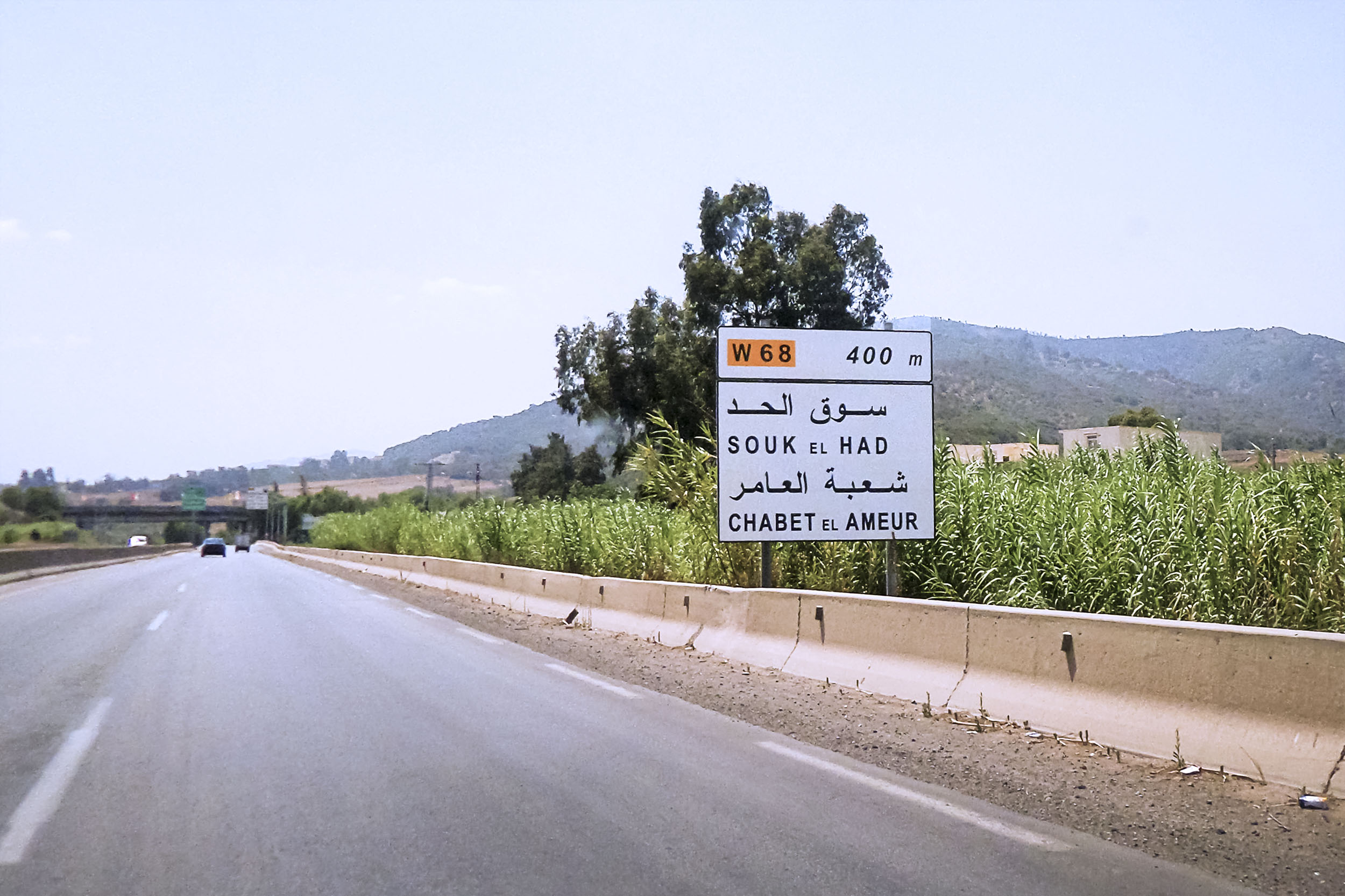
Road of Titouna

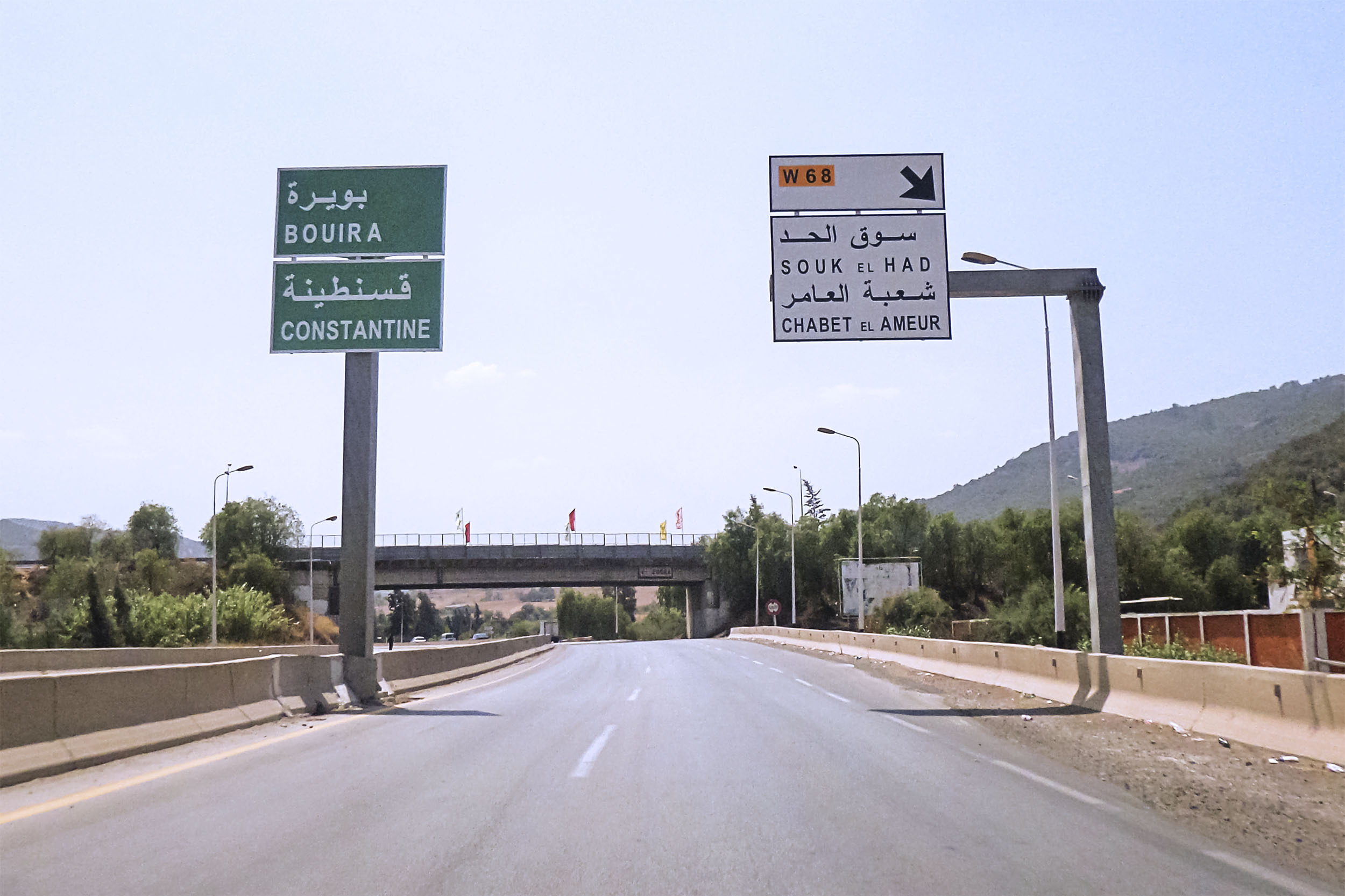
Road of Titouna

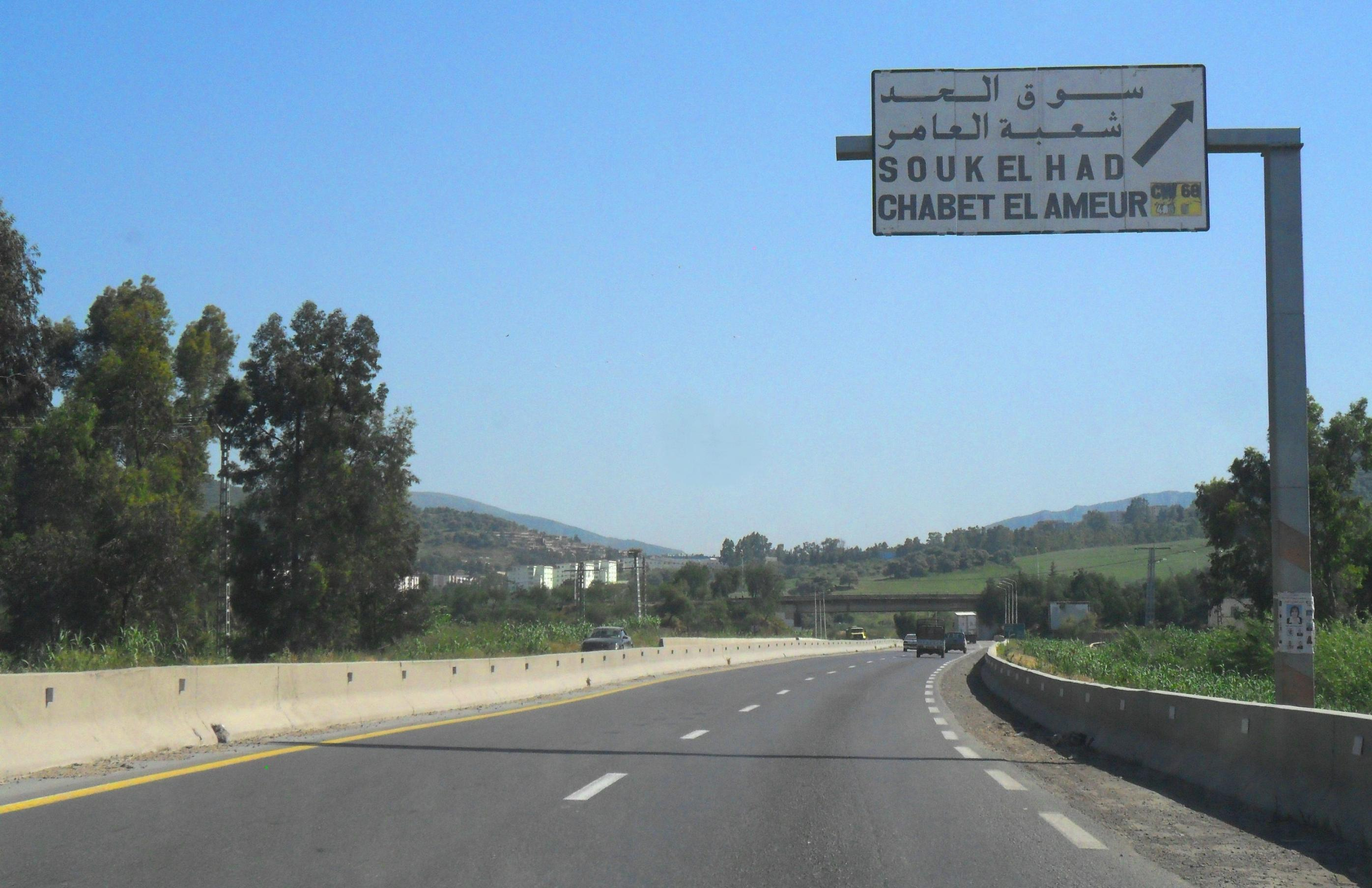
Road of Titouna

== See also ==
- Algeria War
- Torture during the Algerian War of Independence
- List of cultural assets of Algeria
- Ministry of Mujahideen
- Soummam conference
- Battle of Algiers (1956–1957)
- Historic Wilaya IV
- Water torture
- Mujahideen
- Shahid
- Gauleiter
- Called up from the contingent during the Algerian war

== Bibliography ==
- François, Heintz (1982). Le harki des gendarmes rouges: 1954-1962. Collection Témoignage. Volume 8. Paris: Le Cercle d'or. p. 84. ISBN 9782718801018.
- Horne, Alistair. (1977). A Savage War of Peace: Algeria, 1954-1962. Viking Press.
- McDougall, James. (2017). A History of Algeria. Cambridge University Press.
- McDougall, James. (2006). History and the culture of nationalism in Algeria. Cambridge University Press.
