= Titouna =

- Motto: تيتونة
- Interactive map of Titouna
- Commune: Souk El-Had
- District: Thénia District
- Province: Boumerdès Province
- Region: Kabylie
- Country: Algeria

Area
  - Total: 2 km^{2} (0.77 sq mi)

Dimensions
  - Length: 2 km (1.2 mi)
  - Width: 1 km (0.62 mi)
- Elevation: 140 m (460 ft)
- Time zone: UTC+01:00
- Area code: 35020

Titouna is a village in the Boumerdès Province in Kabylie, Algeria.

== Location ==
The village is surrounded by Isser River and the towns of Souk El-Had, Thénia and Beni Amrane in the Khachna mountain range.

== Buildings ==
- Ferme Gauthier

== Gallery ==
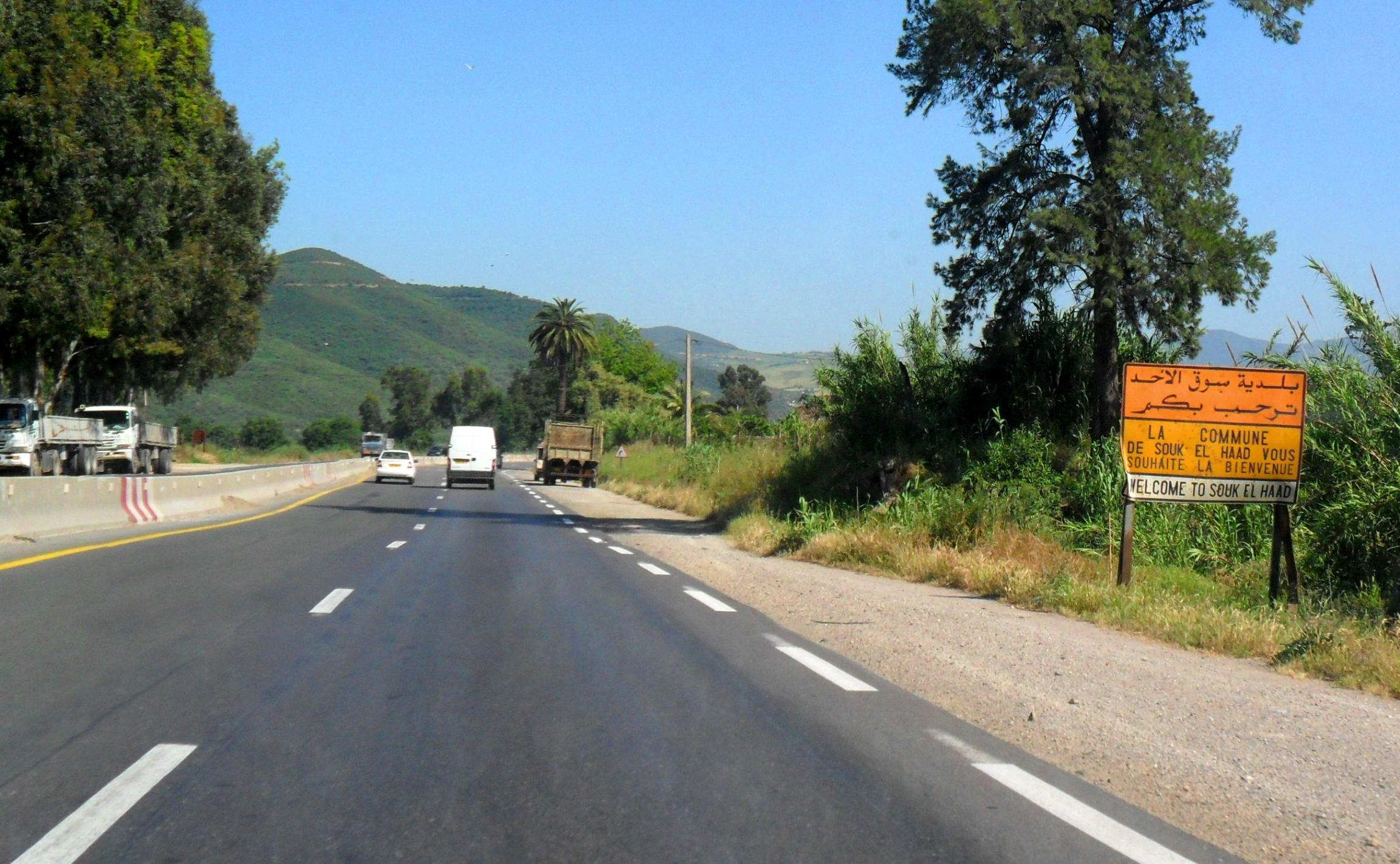
Titouna

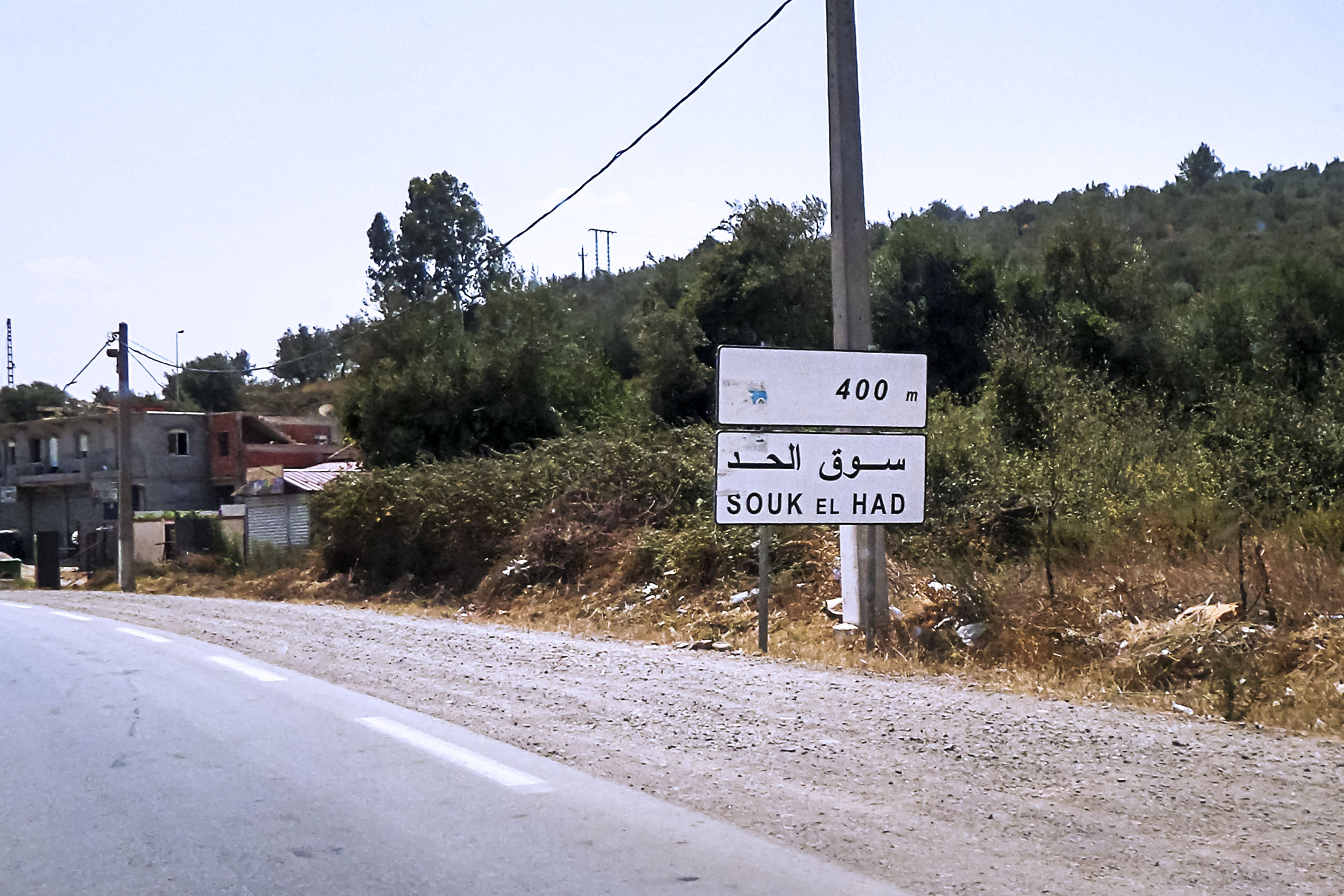
Titouna

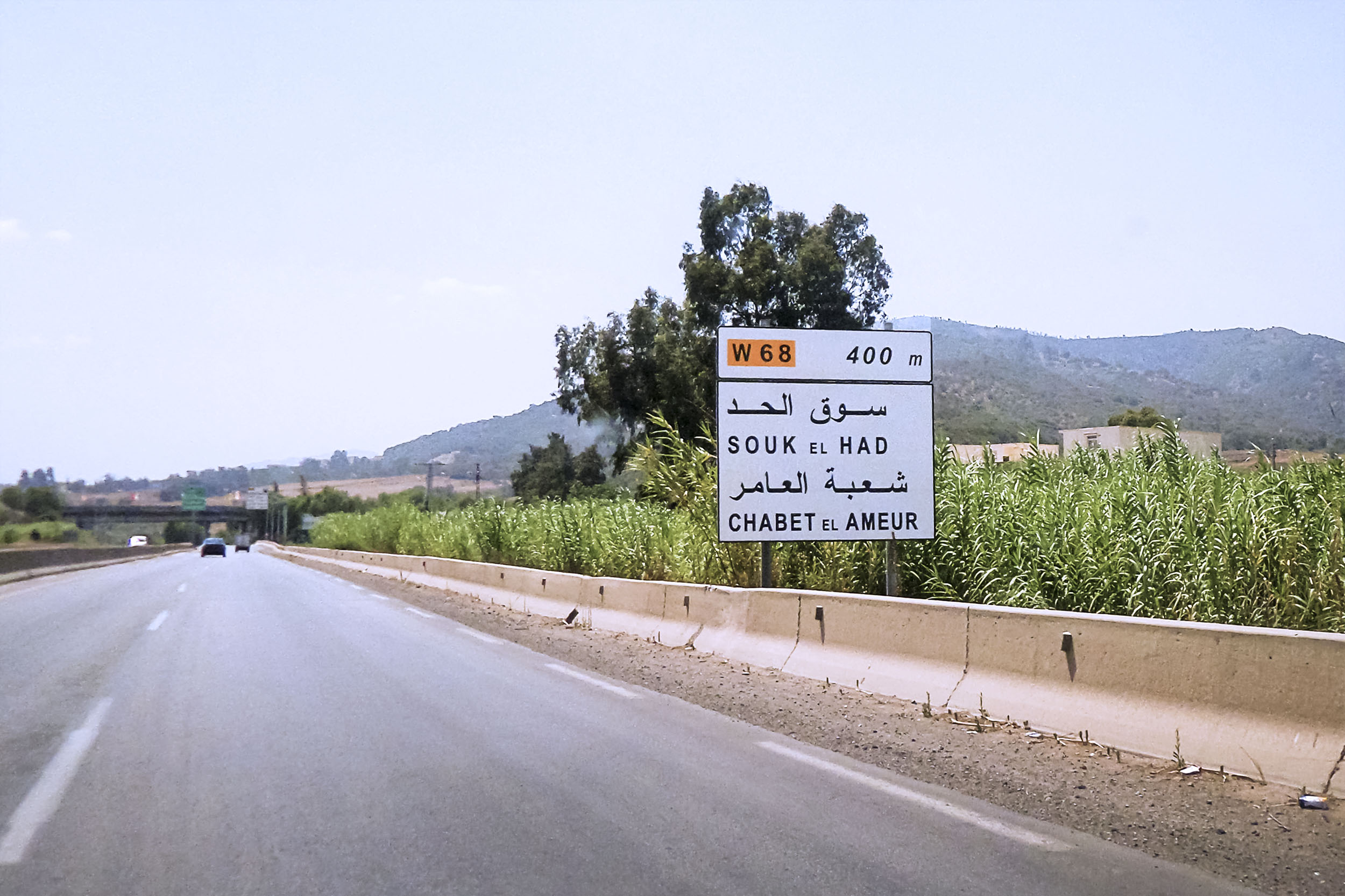
Road of Titouna

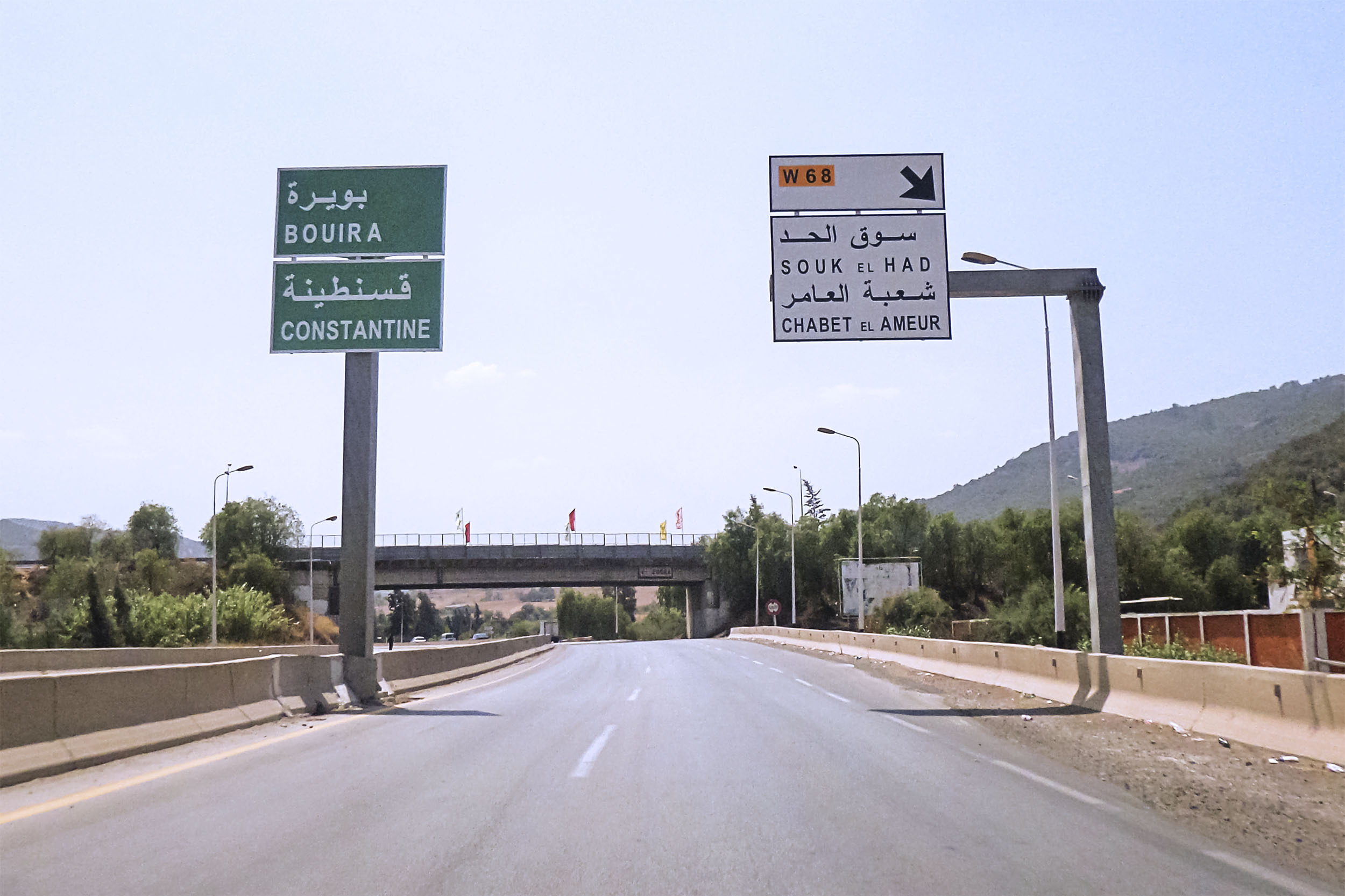
Road of Titouna

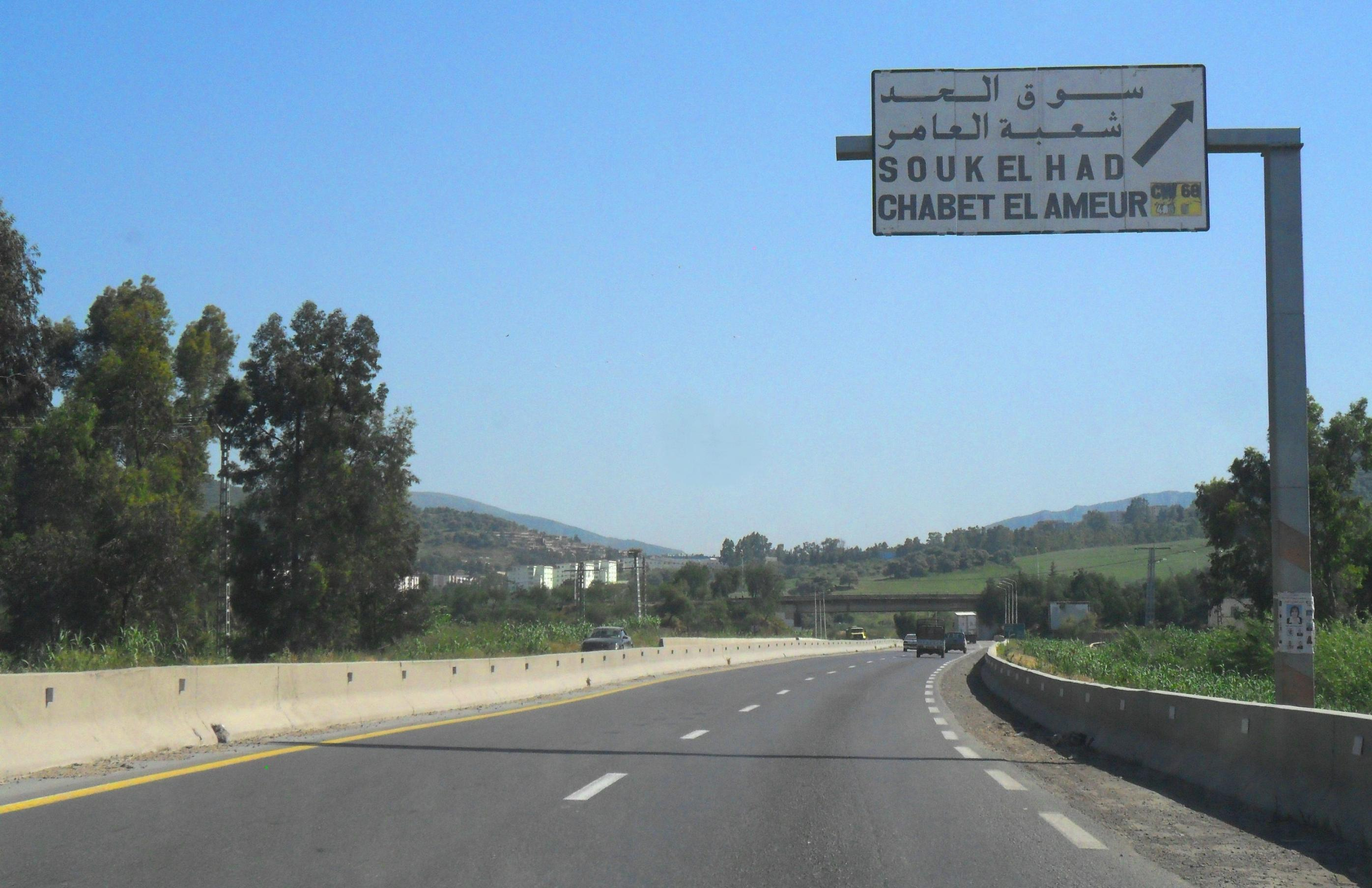
Road of Titouna
