= Souk El Had =

Coordinates: 35°57′23″N 1°14′53″E

- Commune and town
- Interactive map of Souk El Had
- Country: Algeria
- Province: Relizane Province
- Time zone: UTC+1 (CET)

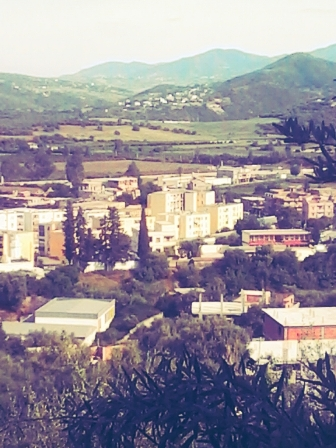
A picture of the top of the mountains of the municipality of Souk Al-Awda

Souk El Had is a town and commune in Relizane Province, Algeria.
