= Dellys District =

Coordinates: 36°55′N 3°53′E

Dellys District دائرة دلس
- District
- Map of Algeria highlighting Boumerdès Province
- Country: Algeria
- Province: Boumerdès
- District seat: Dellys

Population (1998)
  - Total: 49,698
- Time zone: UTC+01 (CET)
- Municipalities: 3

Dellys is a district in Boumerdès Province, Algeria. It was named after its capital, Dellys.

== Municipalities ==
The district is further divided into 3 municipalities:

- Dellys
- Ben Choud
- Aafir

== History ==
=== French conquest ===
- Shipwreck of Dellys (15 May 1830), commanded by Captain Armand Joseph Bruat (1796-1855) and Captain Félix-Ariel d'Assigny (1794-1846).
- First Battle of the Issers (27 May 1837), commanded by General Alexandre Charles Perrégaux (1791-1837) and Colonel Maximilien Joseph Schauenburg (1784-1838).
- First Assault of Dellys (28 May 1837), commanded by Captain Félix-Ariel d'Assigny (1794-1846).
- Second Assault of Dellys (12 May 1844), commanded by General Thomas Robert Bugeaud (1784–1849).

=== Algerian Revolution ===
This commune saw the creation of several clandestine torture centers during the Algerian revolution:

- Camp Gualota in the commune of Dellys.

=== Salafist terrorism ===
- 2007 Dellys bombing (8 September 2007)

== Notable people ==
- Abderrahmane Abdelli, musician
- Habib Ayyoub, writer
- Abderrahmane Benhamida, former Minister of Education
- Abderrahmane Hammad, athlete
- Mokhtar Hasbellaoui, doctor
- Abderrahman Ibrir, footballer
- Rachid Nadji, footballer
- Sidi Yahya al-Tadallisi al-Thaalibi, imam
- Mu'izz ud-Dawla ibn Sumadih, ruler
- Abdelkader Zerrar, Algerian footballer.
