= Baghlia (disambiguation) =

Baghlia is a commune in Boumerdès Province within Algeria.

It may also refer to:

- Baghlia District, a district in Boumerdès Province within Algeria.
- August 2010 Baghlia bombing, a terrorist attack in Algeria.
- 2012 Baghlia bombing, a terrorist attack in Algeria.
