= 2007 in Algeria =

Events from the year 2007 in Algeria.

== Incumbents ==
- President: Abdelaziz Bouteflika
- Prime Minister: Abdelaziz Belkhadem

== Events ==
=== February ===
- February 11: The National Court of Spain finds five out of six Algerian men guilty of membership in a terrorist organization and document forgery for terrorist purposes, sentencing each of them to 13 years imprisonment. All six were acquitted of conspiracy to carry out a terrorist act.

=== April ===
- April 8: Suspected Islamist militants open fire on a military patrol in northwestern Algeria leaving nine soldiers and six attackers dead.
- April 11: Several explosions in Algiers, Algeria, leave 23 dead and dozens of people injured.
- April 12: Al Qaida claims responsibility for the bombings in Algiers, Algeria.

=== May ===
- May 17: Voters in Algeria go to the polls to elect a new People's National Assembly with tight security arrangements after recent bomb attacks.

=== June ===
- June 2: The President of Algeria Abdelaziz Bouteflika accepts the resignation of his Cabinet after recent elections. The Prime Minister of Algeria Abdelaziz Belkhadem is expected to retain his position when a new Cabinet is chosen.

=== August ===
- August 14: Former Islamist guerrilla leader Mustapha Kartali is wounded by a car bomb in Larba, Algeria.
- August 31: While Greece brings the 2007 Greek forest fires under control, 8 people have died in 48 hours in forest fires in northern Algeria, six firefighters die in Croatia and the village of Les Useres in the Valencia region of Spain is evacuated.

=== September ===
- September 8:
  - At least 16 people are killed and 30 injured in a car bomb attack on an Algerian naval barracks in the town of Dellys, 100 km (62 km) east of Algiers.
  - Al Qaeda's North African wing al-Qaeda Organization in the Islamic Maghreb claims responsibility for the bombing and a bombing in Batna less than 48 hours earlier.
- September 9: Five thousand Algerians protest in Algiers after two recent suicide bomb attacks.

=== November ===
- November 17: Algeria's People's National Army kills Abdelhamid Sadaoui, the alleged treasurer of al-Qaeda in North Africa, in Tizi Ouzou, Kabylie province.

=== December ===
- December 11: Al-Qaeda Organization in the Islamic Maghreb claims responsibility for two simultaneous bombings in Algiers, Algeria, causing at least 62 deaths and more injuries.

== Deaths ==
- August 28: Smain Lamari, 67, head of intelligence services, after long illness.
