= Dellys (disambiguation) =

Dellys is a town and commune in Algeria.

It may also refer to:

== Places ==
- Dellys District, a district in Algeria.
- Casbah of Dellys, an old town in Algeria.

== History ==
- Shipwreck of Dellys, a shipwreck in 1830 of French ships in the town of Dellys during French conquest of Algeria.
- First Assault of Dellys, an occupation in 1837 of the town of Dellys during French conquest of Algeria.
- Second Assault of Dellys, an occupation in 1844 of the town of Dellys during French conquest of Algeria.
- 2007 Dellys bombing, a terrorist attack in Algeria.

== People ==
- Dellys Starr, an Australian mountain biker.
