= Baghlia District =

Coordinates: 36°49′N 3°51′E

Baghlia District دائرة بغلية
- District
- Map of Algeria highlighting Boumerdès Province
- Country: Algeria
- Province: Boumerdès
- District seat: Baghlia

Population (1998)
  - Total: 38,046
- Time zone: UTC+01 (CET)
- Municipalities: 3

Baghlia is a district in Boumerdès Province, Algeria. It was named after its capital, Baghlia.

== Municipalities ==
The district is further divided into 3 municipalities:

- Baghlia
- Sidi Daoud
- Taourga

== History ==
=== French conquest ===
- Shipwreck of Dellys (15 May 1830), commanded by Captain Armand Joseph Bruat (1796–1855) and Captain Félix-Ariel d'Assigny (1794–1846).
- Expedition of the Col des Beni Aïcha (1837)
- First Battle of the Issers (27 May 1837), commanded by General Alexandre Charles Perrégaux (1791–1837) and Colonel Maximilien Joseph Schauenburg (1784–1838).
- First Assault of Dellys (28 May 1837), commanded by Captain Félix-Ariel d'Assigny (1794–1846).
- Second Assault of Dellys (12 May 1844), commanded by General Thomas Robert Bugeaud (1784–1849).
- Battle of the Col des Beni Aïcha (1871)

=== Salafist terrorism ===
- August 2010 Baghlia bombing (18 August 2010)
- 2012 Baghlia bombing (29 April 2012)

== Zawiya ==
- Zawiyet Sidi Amar Cherif

== Notable people ==
- Lounés Bendahmane, Algerian footballer.
- Rezki Zerarti, Algerian artist.
- Hocine Ziani, Algerian artist.
- Sidi Amar Cherif, Algerian theologian.
- Abdelkrim Doudène, Algerian footballer.
