= 2007 Algiers bombings =

2007 Algiers bombings may refer to:

- 11 April 2007 Algiers bombings, car bombs that exploded in the Algerian prime minister's headquarters and police stations, Algiers, Algieria
- 11 December 2007 Algiers bombings, car bombs that exploded near the Supreme Constitutional Court and the United Nations offices, Algiers, Algieria
