= Thénia (disambiguation) =

Thénia is a town and commune in Algeria.

It may also refer to:

== Places ==
- Thénia Dam, an hydraulic dam in Algeria
- Thénia District, a district in Algeria

== History ==
- Battle of Thénia (1837), a battle during the French conquest of Algeria.
- Battle of Thénia (1846), a battle during the French conquest of Algeria.
- Battle of Thénia (1871), a battle during the Mokrani Revolt of Algeria.
- 2008 Thénia bombing, a terrorist attack in Algeria.
- 2012 Thénia bombing, a terrorist attack in Algeria.

== Sport ==
- CMB Thénia, a football club in Algeria.
