= Aafir =

Coordinates: 36.767596°N 3.7029°E

- Commune and town
- Country: Algeria
- Province: Boumerdès
- District: Dellys

Population (1998)
  - Total: 12,613
- Time zone: UTC+1 (CET)

Aafir or Afir (Arabic: أعفير, Kabyle: Aɛfir) is a town and commune located on the Mediterranean Sea within Dellys District, Boumerdès Province, northern Algeria. At the 1998 census, it had a population of approximately 12,613. Aafir is one of three communes in the Dellys district, the others being Ben Choud and Dellys itself.

The commune includes the western part of the forest of Mizrana, where the zawiya of Sidi Mhand Saadi is located. This zawiya was abandoned during the 1990s but is currently being renovated.

== History ==
- First Battle of the Issers (1837)

== Notable people ==
- Abderrahmane Abdelli, artist.
