= Taourga =

Coordinates: 36°47′38″N 3°56′47″E

Taourga تاورقة
- Commune and town
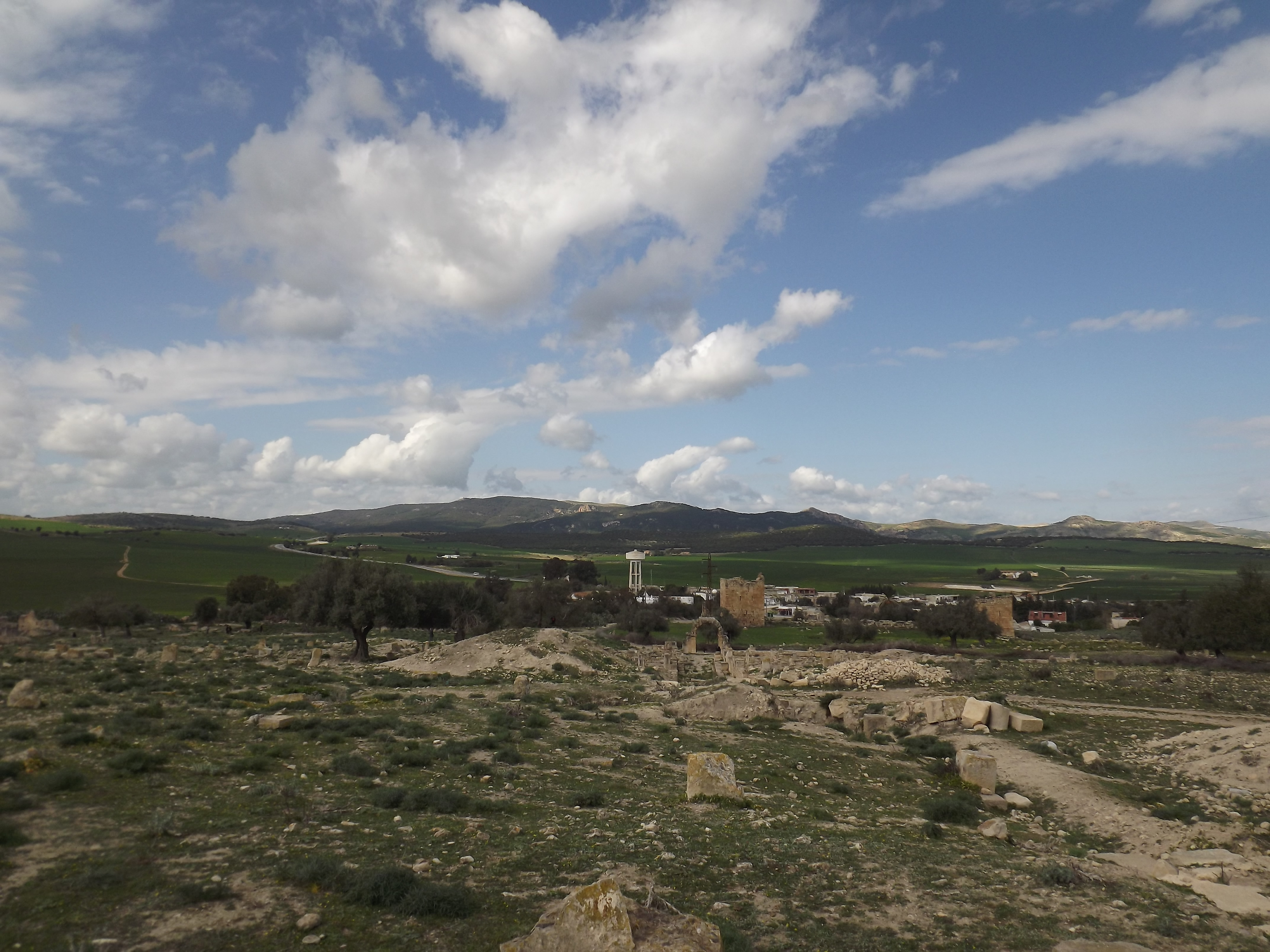
- Taourga Area.
- Nickname: ⵜⴰⵡⴻⵔⴳⴰ
- Country: Algeria
- Province: Boumerdès Province

Population (1998)
  - Total: 7,303
- Time zone: UTC+1 (CET)

Taourga (تاورقة Arabic, Berber ⵜⴰⵡⴻⵔⴳⴰ) is a town and commune in the Baghlia District of Boumerdès Province, Algeria. According to the 1998 census it has a population of 7,303.

== Name ==
The name of the commune is of Berber origin and means "anthill".

== History ==
=== French conquest ===
- Shipwreck of Dellys (15 May 1830), commanded by Captain Armand Joseph Bruat (1796-1855) and Captain Félix-Ariel d'Assigny (1794-1846).
- First Battle of the Issers (27 May 1837), commanded by General Alexandre Charles Perrégaux (1791-1837) and Colonel Maximilien Joseph Schauenburg (1784-1838).
- First Assault of Dellys (28 May 1837), commanded by Captain Félix-Ariel d'Assigny (1794-1846).
- Second Assault of Dellys (12 May 1844), commanded by General Thomas Robert Bugeaud (1784–1849).

== Geography ==
The town is almost mountainous terrain. The town includes the following villages: Beni Attar El Djemaa, Bouhbachou, Boudchicha, Tingrine Ain-El-Kodia, Mazer, Laghdaïr, Wadi Farms and H'lal north on the road to Dellys.

== Algeria Post ==
The postal code of Taourga has gone through several stages since the colonial era to the present. Before the administrative division of Algeria in 1984, the postal code was 15000 But after this, Taourga was attached to the wilaya of Boumerdes bearing number 35. Therefore, the postal code of Taourga taken to the generic digital form 351xxx five digits. Finally, the city received Taourga number 0 giving the postal code 35140.

But in 2008, Taourga received a new postal code of 350 294.

== Water supplies ==
This town has several small dams and a seawater desalination plant as well as several boreholes and wells. This town is crossed by several wadis:

- Dam Thénia 30 000 m^{3}.
- Dam of El Merdjet Feïat: 50 000 m^{3}.
- Dam of El Allal: 60,000 m^{3}
- Dam Chender: 1700000 m^{3}.
- Dam Djinet: 2800000 m^{3}.
- Dam Sidi Daoud: 3700000 m^{3}
- Beni Amrane Dam: 13.1 million m^{3}.
- Dam Hamiz: 16,280,000 m^{3}.
- Keddara dam Bouzegza: 145,600,000 m^{3}.
- Barrage Oued Djemaa: 176 000 000 M^{3}

The town is serviced by Tala Hydroelectric Power Station Ouranim.

== History ==
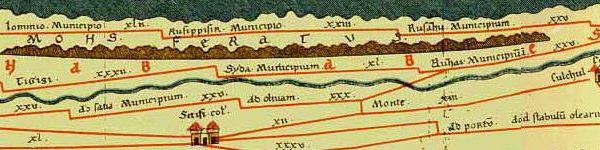
Detail of the Tabula Peutingeriana showing "Tigisi"

During antiquity and the early Middle Ages, Tigisis of Mauretenia was located near present-day Taourga.

In January 1985, Taourga was raised to the commune level. It had been a village administratively connected to the town of Baghlia, located a dozen kilometers to the west.

== Economy ==
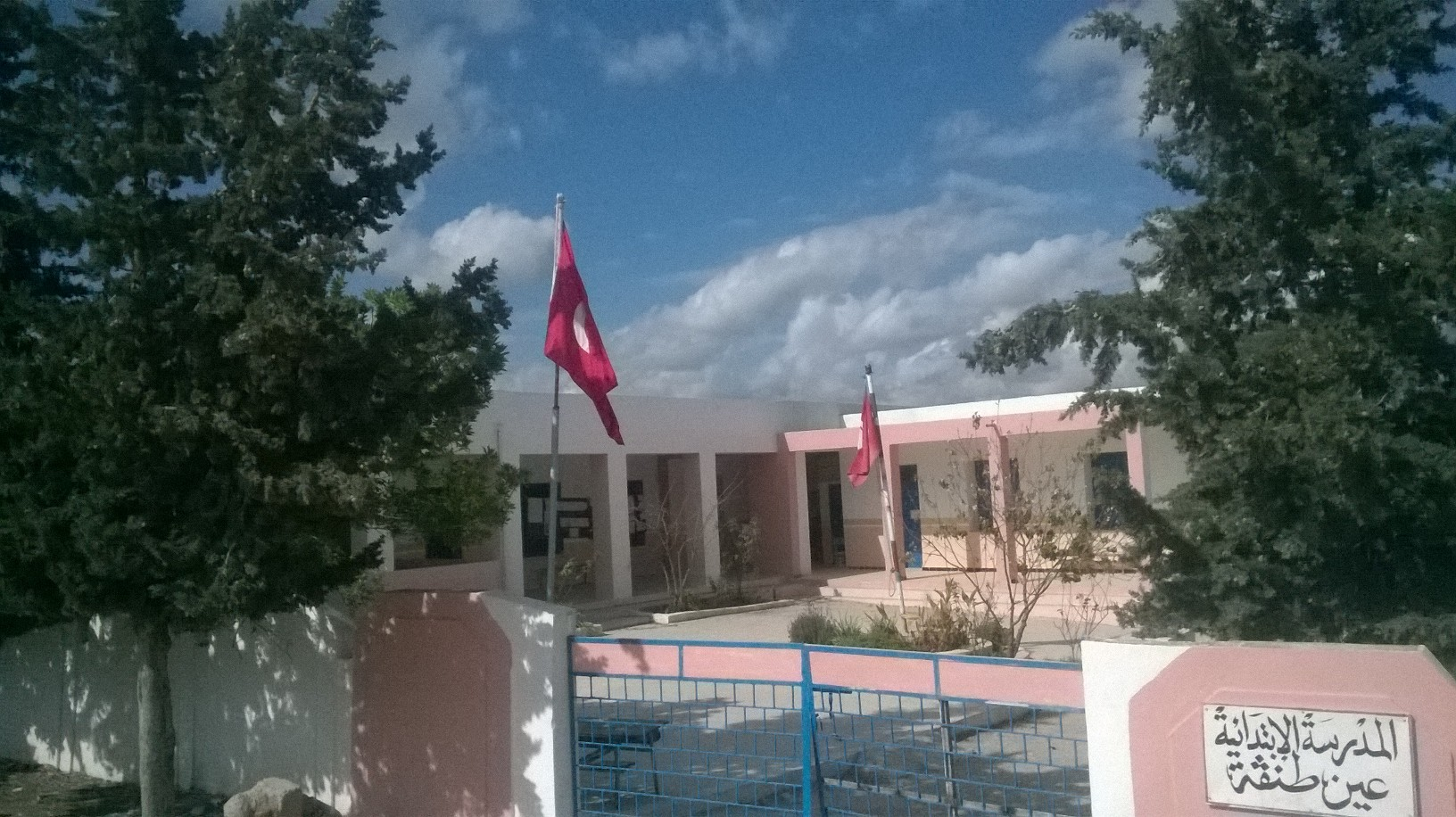
École de Aïn Tounga

Various types of farms out there. The town is famous for its olive oil, mountain agriculture is practiced. The town is well known for its viticulture producing Cardinal (Red Grape), Dattier grapes, Dabouki (Sabel), Saltana, Muscat grape, Red globe grape, and Victoria grape, as well as Hmar bou Amar and Chasselas grapes.

== Notable people ==
- Rezki Zerarti, Algerian artist.
- Abdelkrim Doudène, Algerian footballer.
