= Sofiane el-Fassila =

Algerian terrorist

- Born: 1975; Sidi Daoud Dellys, Algeria
- Died: 6 October 2007 (aged 31–32); Bounouh Kabylie, Algeria
- Other names: Sofiane Fassila, Abu Haidara, Harek Zoheir
- Known for: Terrorism
- Military career
- Allegiance: Salafist Group for Preaching and Combat (1994–2006); Al-Qaeda (2006-2007): AQIM (2006-2007)
- Service years: 1994–2007
- Rank: Emir of central Maghreb for Al-Qaeda and deputy of Abdelmalek Droukdel
- Conflicts: Algerian Civil War: 11 April 2007 Algiers bombings; Insurgency in the Maghreb: Operation Enduring Freedom – Trans Sahara

Sofiane el-Fassila (Arabic: سفيان الفصيلة), also known as Harek Zoheir حارك زهير, (born 1975 – 6 October 2007) served as the second-in-command of Al Qaeda in North Africa until Algerian security forces killed him.

== Life and militant activity ==
Sofiane born in 1975 in Sidi Daoud in the region of Dellys, and he became a militant in the Algerian jihadist group Salafist Group for Preaching and Combat in 1994. In 2006, he was appointed by Abdelmalek Droukdel as the head of central zone of AQIM's operating space. The following year, following the Droukdel's oath of allegiance to al-Qaeda dubbing of Droukdel to the rank of "emir" of al-Qaeda in the Islamic Maghreb, Sofiane became one of his closest commanders. Involved in numerous terrorist attacks, Sofiane was known to be the head of a network specialized in arms trafficking, a cell of which was dismantled in Berriane in 2006. Sofiane was presented as the brain of the attacks of 11 April 2007 in Algiers, perpetrated against the Government Palace in the heart of the capital. However, some sources agree that the real coordinator of the attacks was Sid Ali Rachid, also known as Ali Dix, presented as the "military advisor" of Droukdel. In June 2007, the Court of Boumerdès sentenced him in absentia to 20 years imprisonment and then to life imprisonment for several cases of terrorism. Harek Zoheir died on 6 October 2007, killed in a counter-terrorism operation by the Algerian security forces in the Boghni region of Kabylia. Two other fighters are also killed during the operation.
