= Marie-Théodore Périgot =

French officer

- Born: Marie-Théodore Périgot; 17 October 1807; Strasbourg, Kingdom of France
- Died: 9 May 1888 (aged 80); Nice, Kingdom of France
- Spouse: Anna-Pauline-Antoinette de Champs
- Military career
- Allegiance: France
- Branch: French Army
- Rank: Divisional general
- Conflicts: French conquest of Algeria: Invasion of Algiers in 1830; Battle of Staouéli (1830); Second Assault of Dellys (1844)
- Awards: Legion of Honour

Marie-Théodore Périgot (French: [maʁi teɔdɔʁ peʁiɡo]; 17 October 1807 in Strasbourg – 9 May 1888 in Nice) was a French officer who participated to the French conquest of Algeria.

== Family ==
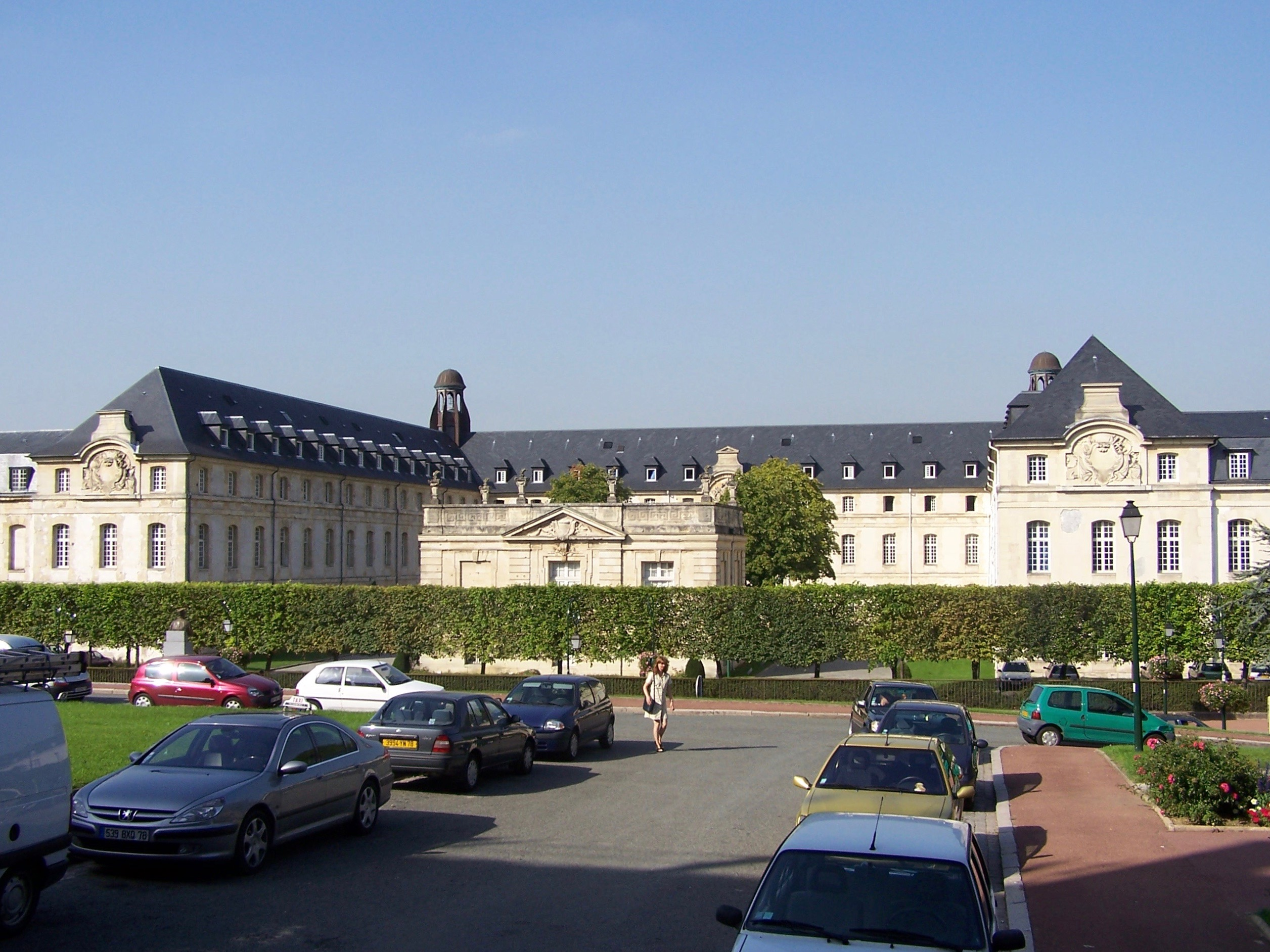
École spéciale militaire de Saint-Cyr

Marie-Théodore Périgot got married with Anna-Pauline-Antoinette de Champs on 12 January 1869 at the age of 62.

Anna-Pauline-Antoinette is a native of the town of La Croix in the department of Nièvre.

== Military training ==
Marie-Théodore was admitted to the École spéciale militaire de Saint-Cyr on 1825 when he was 18 years old.

When he left this military school, he held the head of his promotion there, and he was assigned to the infantry corps.

== Conquest of Algeria ==
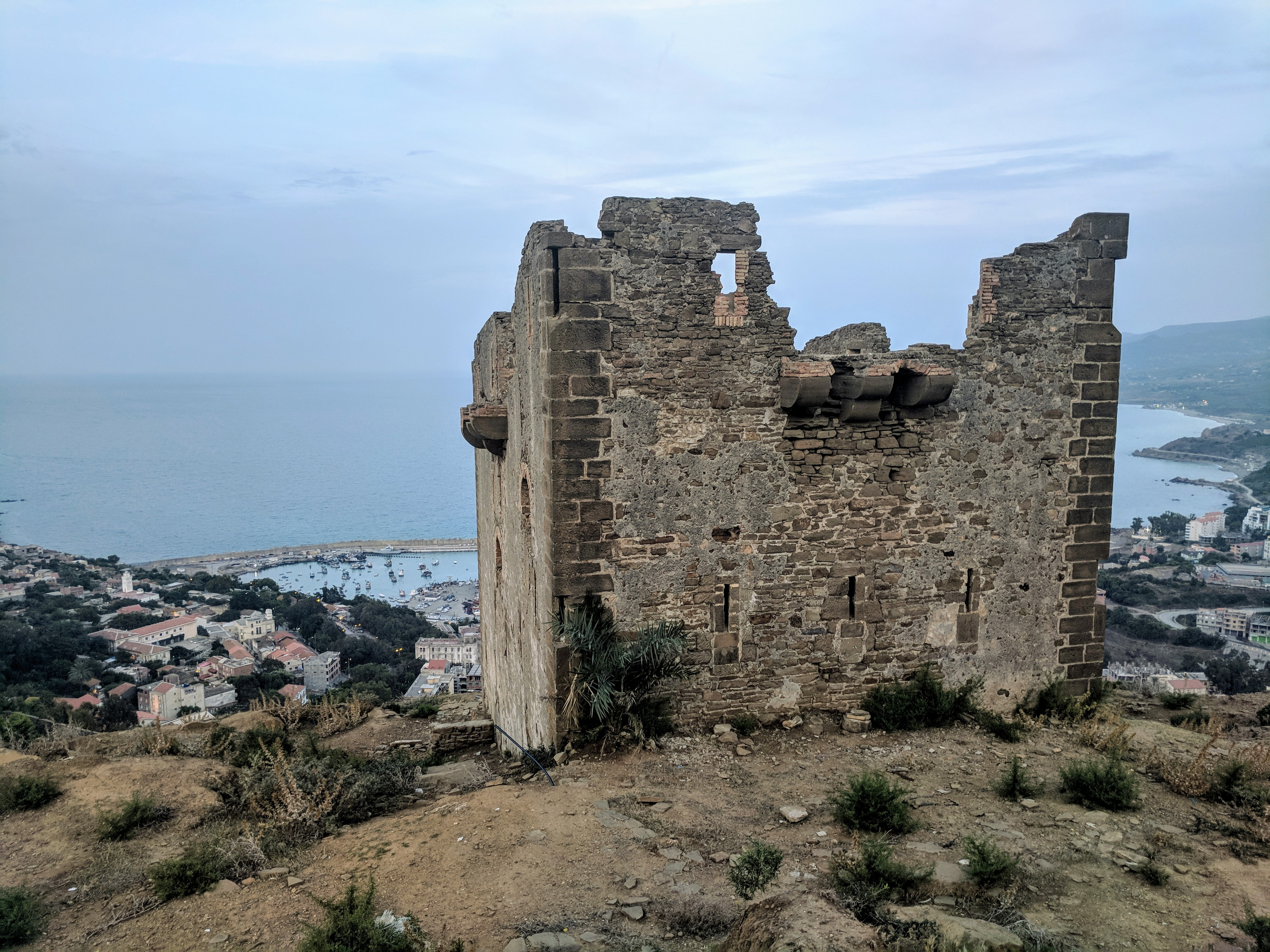
Second Assault of Dellys (1844)

On 14 June 1830, sub-lieutenant Périgot attended the landing of the French Navy for the invasion of Algiers, then took part in the combat of Sidi Fredj.

He then took part on 18 June in the Battle of Staouéli before being a military actor on 5 July in the capture of the Casbah of Algiers.

Captain Périgot was appointed by Marshal Bugeaud as the superior commander of the town of Dellys in Kabylia when it suffered the second assault in May 1844.

== Promotion to officer ==
Périgot was promoted to the rank of lieutenant in 1831, then was awarded the rank of lieutenant colonel at the beginning of the Second French Empire.

Périgot was promoted to the rank of colonel on 30 December 1852, and three years later in 1855, he received the stars of the rank of brigadier general.

He was soon promoted to the high rank of divisional general on 12 August 1861.

== Constantinois ==
General Périgot was appointed in 1864 as governor of the province of Constantinois where he operated several expeditions with his military columns.

He was still there in 1871 when the Mokrani Revolt broke out and spread to the Constantine region.

Périgot was relieved of his functions as governor of Constantine at the beginning of November 1872 to be replaced by General Pouget.

== Retirement ==
General Périgot had retired at the age of 71 since 10 October 1878 with the rank of divisional general.

He was then in receipt of a military retirement pension obtained after his long years of service.

== Awards ==
Great Officer of Legion of Honour.

Marie-Théodore Périgot was decorated with several medals during his military career, including:

- Knight of the Legion of Honour by decree dated 25 April 1840.
- Commandeur of the Legion of Honour by decree dated 29 December 1864.
- Great Officer of the Legion of Honour by decree dated 26 June 1865.

== Death ==
General Périgot died in the city of Nice on 9 May 1888 at the age of 81 and was buried in one of his cemeteries.

== Gallery ==
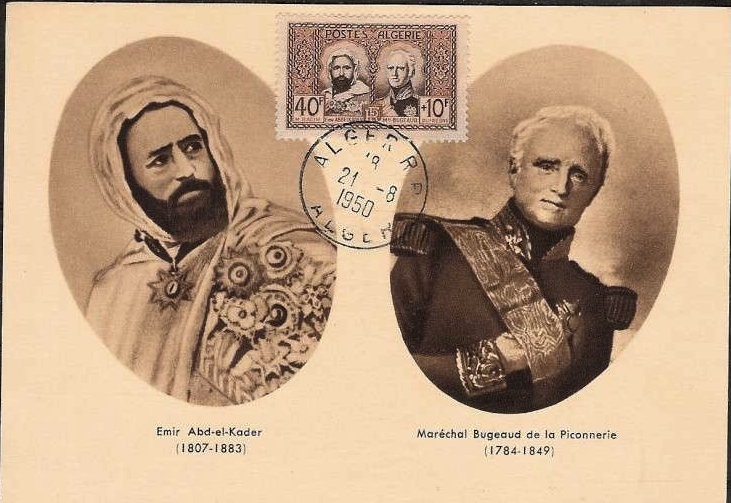
Emir Abdelkader (1808–1883) and Thomas Robert Bugeaud (1784–1849)

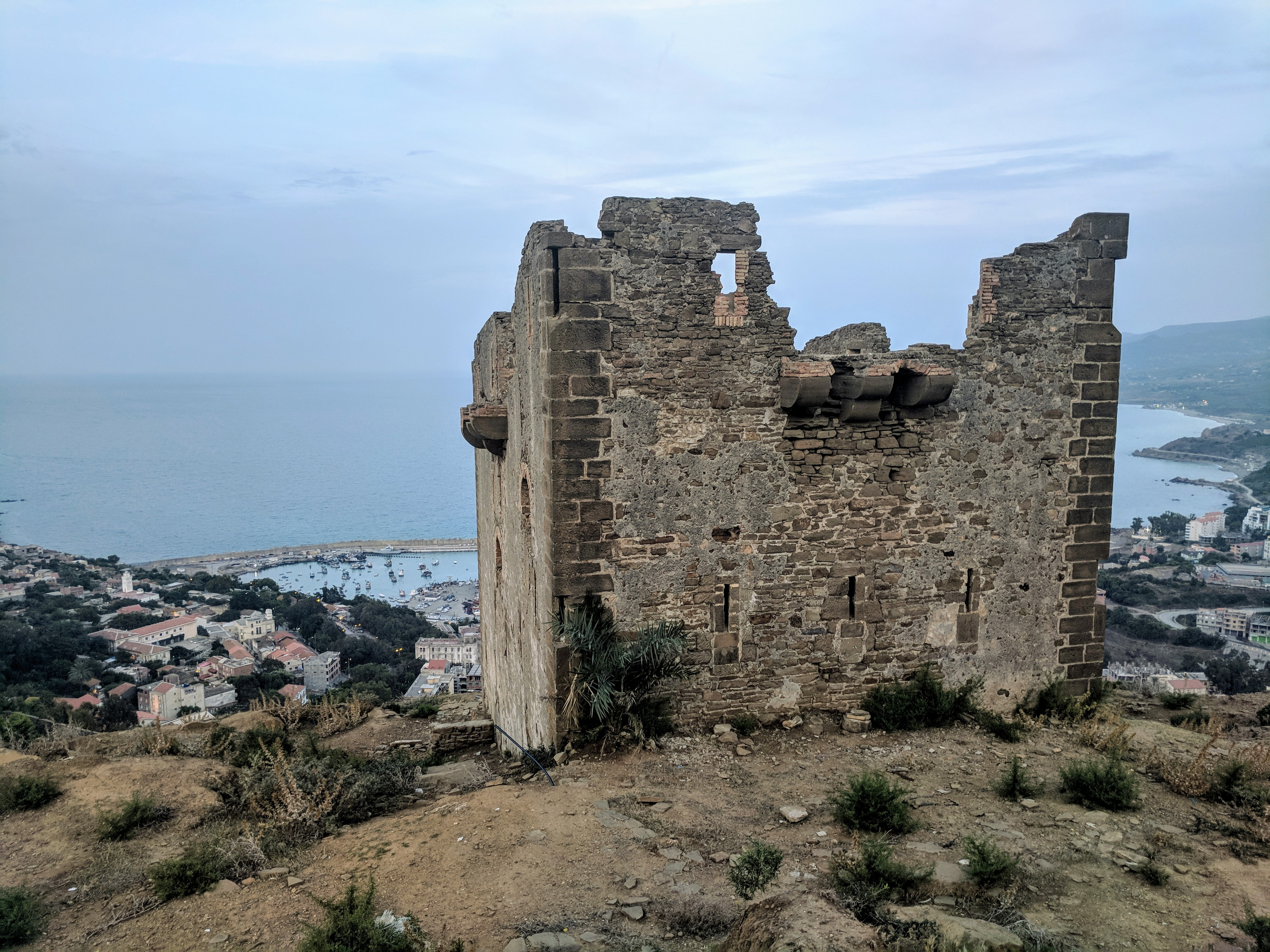
Second Assault of Dellys (1844)

== See also ==
- École spéciale militaire de Saint-Cyr
- French conquest of Algeria
- Invasion of Algiers in 1830
- Battle of Staouéli (1830)
- Second Assault of Dellys (1844)
