= Terrorist bombings in Algeria =

Many bombings were committed during the Algerian Civil War that began in 1991. The Salafist Group for Preaching and Combat (GSPC) claimed responsibility for many of them, while for others no group has claimed responsibility. These terrorist incidents generated a widespread sense of fear in Algeria. The number of bombings peaked in 2007, with a smaller peak in 2002, and they were particularly concentrated in the areas between Algiers and Tizi Ouzou, with very few occurring in the east or in the Sahara.

This list is not exhaustive and sources frequently disagree on the number of deaths.

== 1985 ==
- 1985 Soumâa bombing (26 August 1985)

== 2000 ==
- 2000 Mascara bombing (16 June 2000)
- 2000 Tizi Ouzou bombing (28 September 2000)

== 2002 ==
- 2002 Tazmalt bombing (15 May 2002)
- 2002 Miliana bombing (20 June 2002)
- 2002 Hammam Righa bombing (21 June 2002)
- 2002 Larbâa bombing (5 July 2002)
- 2002 M'Sila bombing (21 November 2002)

== 2003 ==
- 2003 Tizi Ouzou bombing (15 June 2003)

== 2004 ==
- 2004 Tebessa bombing (12 March 2004)

== 2005 ==
- 2005 Tidjelabine bombing (29 July 2005)

== 2006 ==
- 2006 Tidjelabine bombing (19 June 2006)
- 2006 Boudouaou bombing (8 August 2006)
- 2006 Algiers bombings (30 October 2006)
- 2006 Bouchaoui bombing (10 December 2006)

== 2007 ==
- 2007 Souk El Had bombing (11 February 2007)
- 2007 Tizi Ouzou bombings (13 February 2007)
- 2007 Algiers bombings (11 April 2007)
- 2007 Constantine bombing (16 May 2007)
- 2007 Lakhdaria bombing (11 July 2007)
- 2007 Batna bombing (6 September 2007)
- 2007 Dellys bombing (8 September 2007)
- 2007 Algiers bombings (11 December 2007)

== 2008 ==
- 2008 Naciria bombing (2 January 2008)
- 2008 Thénia bombing (29 January 2008)
- 2008 Beni Amrane bombings (9 June 2008)
- 2008 Zemmouri bombing (9 August 2008)
- 2008 Issers bombing (19 August 2008)

== 2009 ==
- 2009 Bordj Bou Arréridj bombing (17 June 2009)

== 2010 ==
- 2010 Tidjelabine bombing (7 April 2010)
- 2010 Ammal bombing (11 June 2010)
- August 2010 Baghlia bombing (18 August 2010)
- 2010 Bordj Menaïel bombing (21 September 2010)

== 2011 ==
- 2011 Tizi Ouzou bombing (13 August 2011)

== 2012 ==
- 2012 Thénia bombing (11 January 2012)
- 2012 Baghlia bombing (29 April 2012)

== 2013 ==
- 2013 Tiguentourine bombing (16 January 2013)

== 2014 ==
- 2014 Tizi Ouzou bombing (20 April 2014)

== 2026 ==
- 2026 Blida bombing (13 April 2026)

== See also ==
- Algerian Civil War
- Timeline of the Algerian Civil War
- Human rights in Algeria
- List of massacres in Algeria
- List of massacres during the Algerian Civil War
