= 2009 Algerian military ambush =

Terrorist incident in Algeria

Coordinates: 36°4′25.8″N 4°45′46.6″E

Algerian military ambush
- Bordj Bou Arréridj Province shown within Algeria
- Location: Bordj Bou Arréridj, Algeria
- Date: Thursday, June 17, 2009; 8 p.m.
- Deaths: at least 18
- Injuries: currently unknown
- Perpetrator: Islamist rebels in Algeria

An ambush on the Algerian paramilitary took place on June 17, 2009, at 8:00 pm (19:00 GMT), when Algerian paramilitary escorting Chinese construction workers to a motorway project came under attack from Islamist rebels. Early reports suggested 18 soldiers were killed; some news outlets are reporting that 24 soldiers were killed.

Attacks such as these had been thought to be decreasing prior to the incident, but suddenly began to increase again. The attack was the deadliest aimed at Algeria's government forces for six months.

== The ambush ==
Islamist rebels first attacked the convoy on a highway in the province of Bourdj Bou Arréridj, 180 kilometres (110 mi) east of the capital Algiers by detonating two home-made bombs. The gendarmes were then sprayed with bullets. Attackers then reportedly stole the soldiers' uniforms and weapons. Total rebel casualties are unknown. The injured soldiers were taken to nearby hospitals. They stole weapons and several police vehicles.

Algerian security forces launched an operation using helicopters to track and apprehend the militants.

== Similar incident ==
This ambush followed a similar incident on 3 June 2009. Two teachers and eight police escorts died near Algiers whilst in the act of transporting examinations from an examination centre. The teachers' car was bombed and two police cars were fired on.

On 20 April 2014, a similar ambush lead to death of 14 Soldiers in the Tizi Ouzou province of Algeria.

== See also ==
- Terrorist bombings in Algeria
