= Marciana of Toledo =

Spanish martyr

Saint Marciana
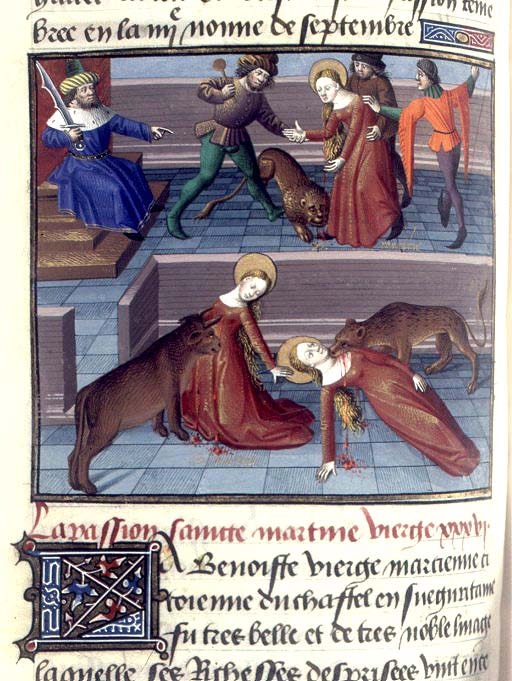
- The Martyrdom of Saint Marciana. 15th century French manuscript.

Martyr
- Born: Dellys, Kabylia
- Died: 304; Caesarea in Mauretania, Mauretania Caesariensis
- Venerated in: Catholic Church
- Feast: January 9
- Attributes: sometimes depicted with a leopard and bull near her
- Patronage: invoked to cure wounds

Marciana of Toledo, also known as Marciana of Mauretania and Marciana of Caesarea, (died 9 January 304) is venerated as a martyr and saint.

== Veneration ==
Her feast day is celebrated by both the Catholic Church and the Eastern Orthodox Church on July 12. In some early calendars, her feast day is celebrated on January 9.

The Mozarabic office has a special hymn in her honor.

== Life ==
According to Alban Butler, Marciana was a native of Rusuccur (Dellys) in Mauretania, in modern day Algeria.

Historian Brent Shaw states that her legend emphasized her virginity and commitment to asceticism, and contained "a new kind of hostility that was added to the old story of Christian-pagan hatreds". According to her story, Marciana was a devout young Christian woman "so filled with zeal for her new faith" that she left her family home to reside in Caesarea, approximately 128 km east of their home and "immediately displayed an aggressive hostility to traditional forms of civic religion".

She abhorred the worldly benefits of a high social status and she put aside her worldly riches. She traveled to Caesarea, Mauretania (modern-day Algeria) and took up residence in a cave in order to preserve her virginity (for she was said to be very beautiful) and consecrated herself to God through various exercises in fasts and other practices of self-deprivation that were used in lieu of martyrdom. Caesarea was by that time occupied by the Roman Empire under the Emperor Diocletian (284-305 A.D.).

== Martyrdom ==
Marciana's martyrdom occurred during the Diocletianic Persecution. The Latin account of her martyrdom was written possibly in the 5th century. Shaw states that she led an "aggressive anti-idolatry campaign". While walking in the public square, Marciana attacked a statue of the Roman goddess Diana, tearing the head off and smashing the body to pieces. The local citizens had her arrested and brought her before the governor's tribunal for punishment. She was imprisoned in the local gladiatorial school, which Shaw states was "a brutal test" of her sexual purity. Marciana was then punished by being thrown in the local arena, where she was mangled by a bull. After her death, a leopard was sent in and it snapped her neck.

Marciana died in Caesarea, Mauretania Caesariensis. Her relics were moved to Toledo, which led to her being known as "Marciana of Toledo."

Shaw states that Marciana's story demonstrates the conflict between the Christian and Jewish communities in Caesarea during the period and was part of the "long and well-developed” anti-Jewish literature of the time. Shaw cautions, however, that narratives like this, that directly include Jews in the persecution of Christians in Africa during the 4th and 5th centuries, were "exceedingly rare".

== See also ==
- Torero
