= 2008 Thénia bombing =

Bombing occurred on January 29, 2008 in Thénia within Algeria

Coordinates: 36.7256687°N 3.5572704°E

- Boumerdès Province highlighted within Algeria
- Location: (Algeria) Thénia, Boumerdès Province
- Date: January 29, 2008
- Attack type: Suicide Bombing
- Deaths: 2
- Injuries: 23
- Perpetrator: Al-Qaeda Organization in the Islamic Maghreb

The 2008 Thénia bombing occurred on January 29, 2008, when a suicide bomber drove and detonated a vehicle laden with explosives into the headquarters of the Algerian police (BMPJ) in the town of Thénia, Boumerdès Province, Algeria killing 2 and injuring 23. The Al-Qaeda Organization in the Islamic Maghreb is suspected as being responsible.

== See also ==
- Terrorist bombings in Algeria
- List of terrorist incidents, 2008
