= 2012 Thénia bombing =

Bombing occurred on January 11, 2012 in Thénia within Algeria

Coordinates: 36.7256687°N 3.5572704°E

- Boumerdès Province highlighted within Algeria
- Location: (Algeria) Thénia, Boumerdès Province
- Date: January 11, 2012
- Attack type: Suicide Bombing
- Injuries: 2
- Perpetrator: Al-Qaeda Organization in the Islamic Maghreb

The 2012 Thénia bombing occurred on January 11, 2012 when a bomb detonated against a patrol of the Algerian Customs in the town of Thénia, Boumerdès Province, Algeria injuring 2. The Al-Qaeda Organization in the Islamic Maghreb was suspected as being responsible.

== See also ==
- Terrorist bombings in Algeria
- List of terrorist incidents, 2012
