= December 11, 2007, Algiers bombings =

Terrorist attacks

2007 Algiers bombings
- Location: Algiers, Algeria
- Date: 11 December 2007; 09:30 (GMT+1)
- Target: United Nations, Constitutional Court
- Attack type: suicide bombings
- Deaths: 41 (incl. 17 UN staff)
- Injuries: 170
- Perpetrator: claimed by al-Qaeda in the Islamic Maghreb

On 11 December 2007 in the Algerian capital of Algiers, two car bombs exploded ten minutes apart, starting at around 9:30 a.m. local time. Al-Qaeda in the Islamic Maghreb claimed responsibility for the attacks, stating that it was "another successful conquest [...] carried out by the Knights of the Faith with their blood in defense of the wounded nation of Islam." These attacks were part of an ongoing Islamic insurgency, a continuation of the Algerian Civil War (1992–2002) that caused 200,000 deaths.

== Targets ==
Two car bombs containing 800 kg (1,700 lb) of explosives each were used in the bombings. The first explosion occurred in the Ben Aknoun district, near the Supreme Constitutional Court. This was followed ten minutes later by a second blast on the road that separates the United Nations offices from the offices of the UNHCR (United Nations High Commissioner for Refugees) in the Hydra neighborhood. The United Nations building partially collapsed in the explosion while the UNHCR offices were "leveled" according to a UNHCR official. The United Nations building housed the offices of the UN Development Programme (UNDP), the World Food Programme (WFP), the International Labour Organization (ILO), the UN Industrial Development Organization (UNIDO), the Joint UN Programme on HIV/AIDS (UNAIDS), the Department of Safety and Security (DSS) and the Population Fund (UNFPA). The collapsed section mainly housed the UNDP.

The attack against the UN office was a suicide bombing. It is as yet unknown whether the same is true for the Constitutional Court attack.

The attack caused the third highest staff casualties in the history of the United Nations, after the 2003 Canal Hotel bombing, which targeted the UN headquarters in Baghdad, Iraq, and also killed the Secretary-General's Special Representative to Iraq Sérgio Vieira de Mello and 21 other staff members and the 2010 Haiti earthquake in which 22 UN peacekeepers have been confirmed dead as of 14 January 2010; and 150 missing. The Head of MINUSTAH was killed in the disaster.

== Casualties ==
Deaths by nationality
Country	Number
Algeria	37+
Denmark	1
Philippines	1
Senegal	1
China	1
Total	41+

The bombings are believed to have killed at least 31 people. Among the dead were 17 United Nations employees at work in their offices, including 14 Algerians and a Dane, a Filipino, and a Senegalese. A Chinese construction worker was also killed. This official death toll, provided by Algerian Interior Minister Yazid Zerhouni, conflicts with numbers reported by hospital and rescue officials, which triple the government's count.

Many people are still unaccounted for. A number of them are possibly still trapped under the rubble, according to UN spokeswoman Maria Okabe. Jean Fabre, head of the UN Development Programme's Geneva office, indicated they were still searching for survivors in the rubble.

177 people were injured in total, according to Zerhouni. CNN has confirmed that the bombers used homemade nitroglycerin bombs, which had iron nails in them to increase casualties.

The United Nations Security Council held an official meeting on the same day in order to condemn the attacks.

== See also ==
- Terrorist bombings in Algeria
- 11 April 2007 Algiers bombings
- Attacks on humanitarian workers
