= 2007 Batna bombing =

Terrorist incident in Algeria

Coordinates: 35°33′04″N 6°10′38″E

2007 Batna bombings
- Batna province
- Location: Batna, Algeria
- Date: 6 September 2007
- Target: Abdelaziz Bouteflika
- Attack type: suicide bombings
- Deaths: 15—22
- Injuries: 70—107
- Perpetrator: Al-Qaeda in the Islamic Maghreb

The 2007 Batna bombing took place on 6 September 2007 in Batna, a town in Batna Province, eastern Algeria.

The bombing, which took place shortly before the visit of Algerian President Abdelaziz Bouteflika, resulted in 15-20 deaths and 107 injuries as the bomber detonated his device among a crowd waiting to see the President, who was at the end of a three-day tour of eastern Algeria.

== The bombing ==
The suicide bomber was among the crowd awaiting outside the Al-Atik mosque the arrival of President Bouteflika when his device, a "plastic bag containing the explosive" and his "agitated" manner was noticed 45 minutes prior to the Bouteflika's arrival. This forced the bomber, a "man aged 30 to 35" to detonate his device prematurely as police approached him. However it is unknown whether the bomber himself escaped the blast, however interior minister Noureddine Yazid was quoted by the Algerian news agency APS as stating that the bomber had escaped through a security cordon.

== Aftermath and reactions ==
On 8 September, the Algerian Islamic Salvation Front was reported to have condemned the attacks, joining Bouteflika in calling the perpetrators "criminals". While there was no immediate claim of responsibility, the Algerian president cited Islamic militants as the perpetrators. APS also quoted the President as stating that "Terrorist acts have absolutely nothing in common with the noble values of Islam", he also visited the surviving wounded at nearby hospitals. On 9 September 2007, al-Qaeda in the Islamic Maghreb stated that it was responsible for the attack, as well as a previous bombing 48 hours earlier. On a website, al-Qaeda stated "We reiterate that the majority of those killed in this operation were from the police and security forces ... and that our brother did not target innocent people as reported by the media," of both attacks, the group said they were carried out "in defense of Islam and the Islamic nation."

The governments of both Algeria and the United States warned citizens to avoid overland travel between Algerian cities, and for foreign tourists to remain in secure hotels.

== See also ==
- Terrorist bombings in Algeria
