= Abderrahmane Benhamida =

Algerian politician (1931–2010)

- عبد الرحمن بن حميدة

Minister of National Education
- In office 27 September 1962 – 18 September 1963
- President: Ahmed Ben Bella
- Prime Minister: Ahmed Ben Bella

Personal details
- Born: 21 October 1931 Dellys, French Algeria
- Died: 5 September 2010 (aged 78) Algiers, Algeria
- Profession: Manager; politician

Abderrahmane Benhamida (Note: Arabic: عبد الرحمن بن حميدة) (21 October 1931 – 5 September 2010) was an Algerian independence fighter and politician who served in the government of Algeria as Minister of National Education from 1962 to 1963. After the crisis of 1988, he became a co-founder (with Benyoucef Benkhedda and others) of El Oumma, an effort to bring together Islamist and Nationalist parties.
