= Dellys =

City in Algeria

Dellys دلس Tadallis (Berber)
- City and Daira
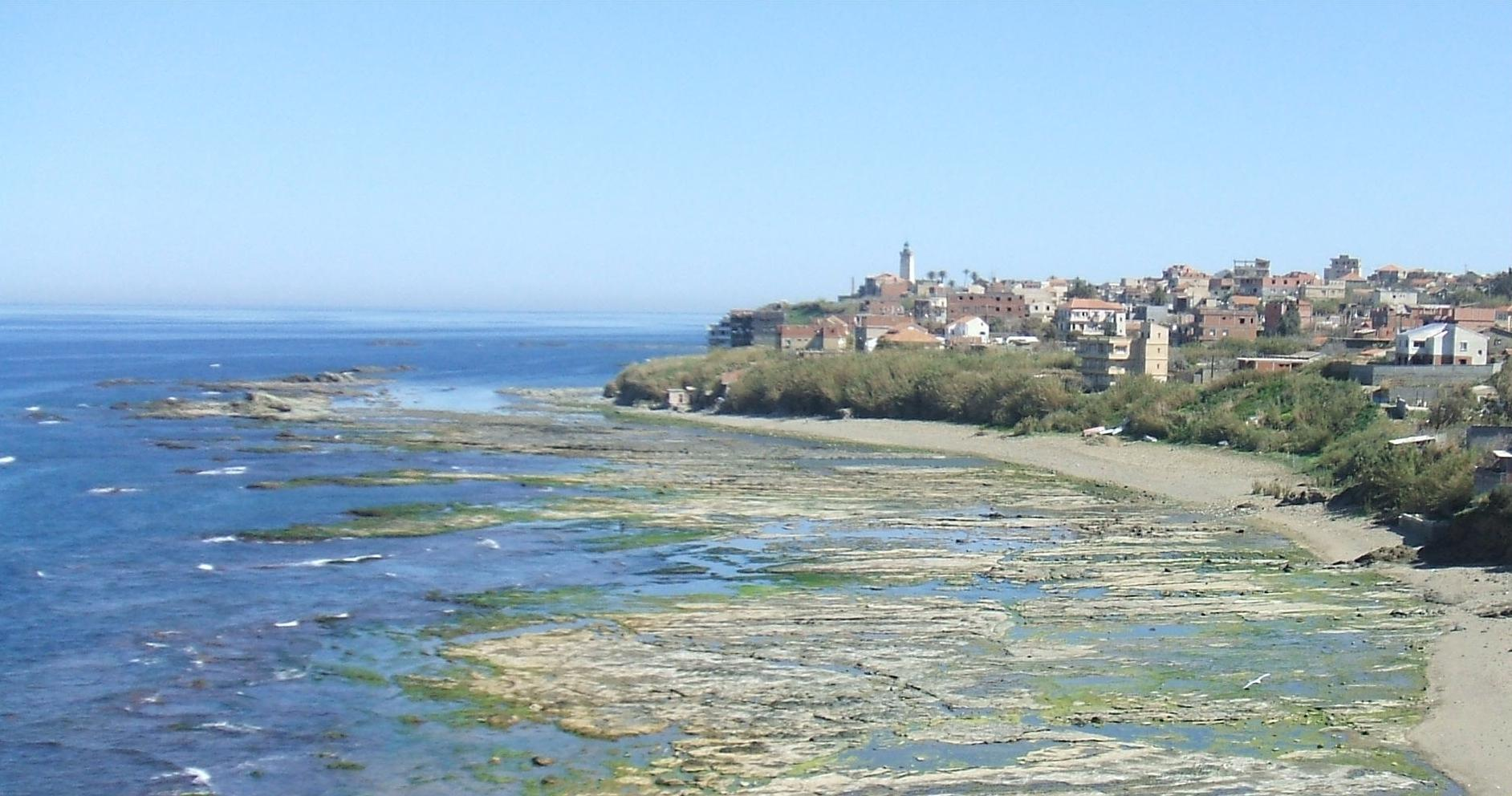
- Dellys
- Motto: "From the people, for the people"
- Location of Dellys in Boumerdès Province

- Location of Dellys in Algeria
- Coordinates: 36.913272°N 3.914094°E
- Country: Algeria
- Province: Boumerdès
- District: Dellys District
- APC: 2012–2017

Government
  - Type: Municipality
  - Mayor: Rabah Zerouali (RND)

Area
  - Total: 2,504 sq mi (6,486 km^{2})

Population (2008)
  - Total: 32,954
- Time zone: UTC+1 (CET)
- Postal code: 35100
- ISO 3166 code: CP
- Website: Official website
- Cap Bengut Lighthouse
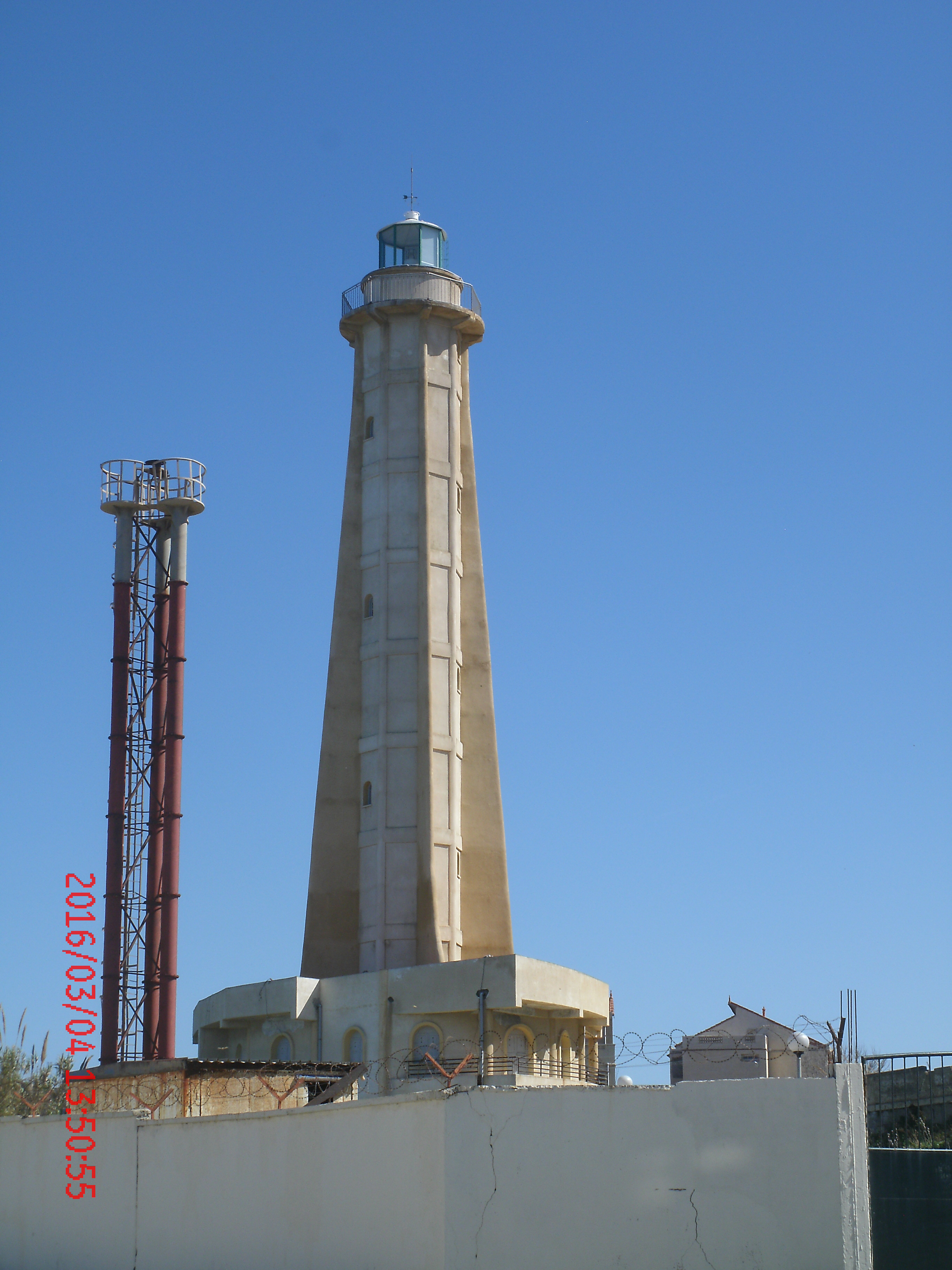
- the concrete lighthouse built in 2010 (right) next to the metal tower built in 2004 (left)
- Constructed: 2010
- Construction: concrete
- Height: 28.9 m (95 ft)
- Shape: octagonal prism tower with four buttresses with balcony and lantern
- Markings: grey metallic lantern
- Operator: Office Nationale de Signalisation Maritime
- Focal height: 63 m (207 ft)
- Range: 29 nmi (54 km; 33 mi)
- Characteristic: Fl (4) W 15s.
- Algeria no.: DZ-2700
- Second lighthouse
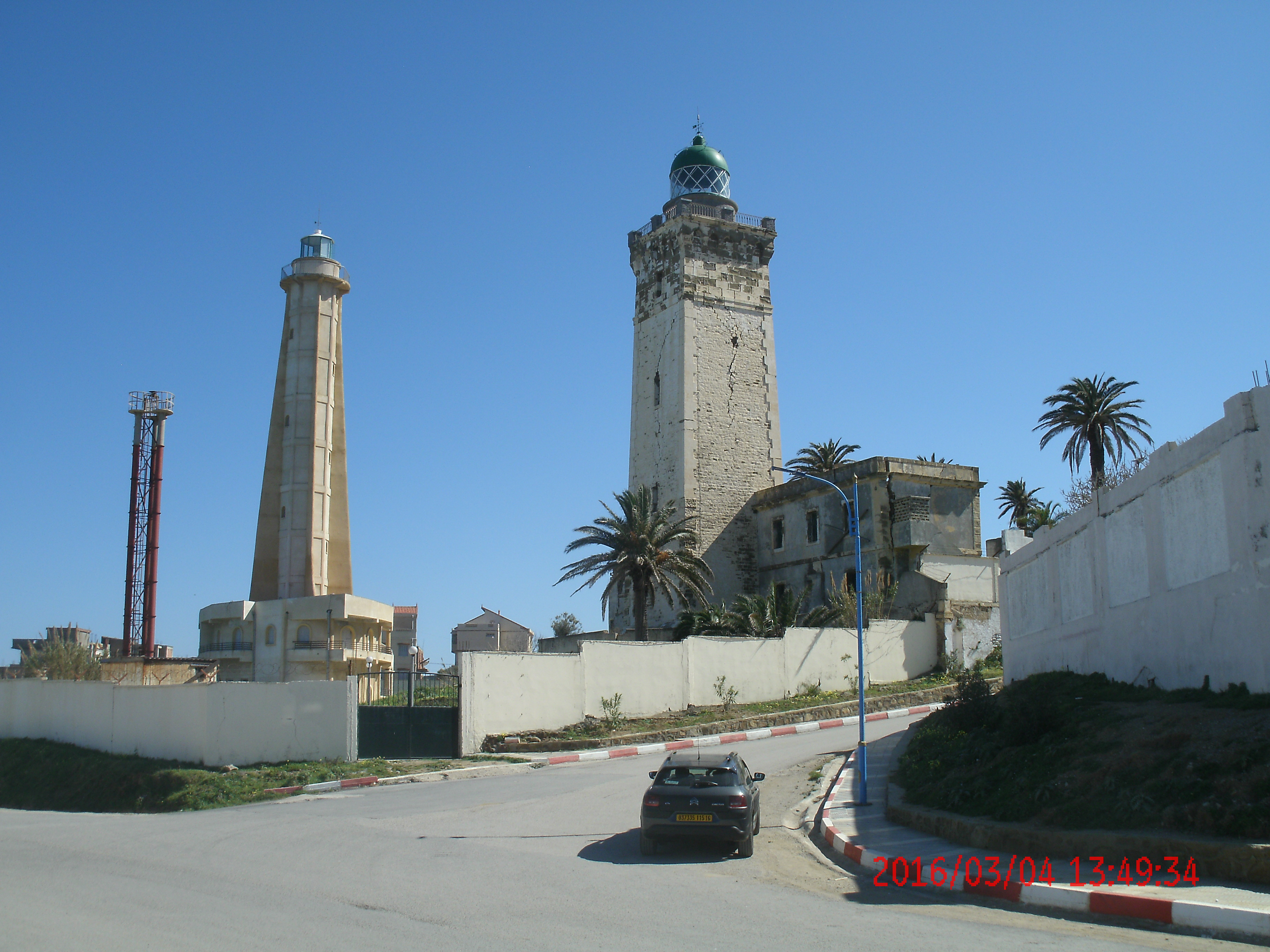
- Constructed: 2004
- Construction: metal skeletal tower
- Height: 15 m (49 ft)
- Shape: triangular skeletal tower with balcony and light
- Markings: red tower with a white band atop
- Deactivated: 2017
- First lighthouse
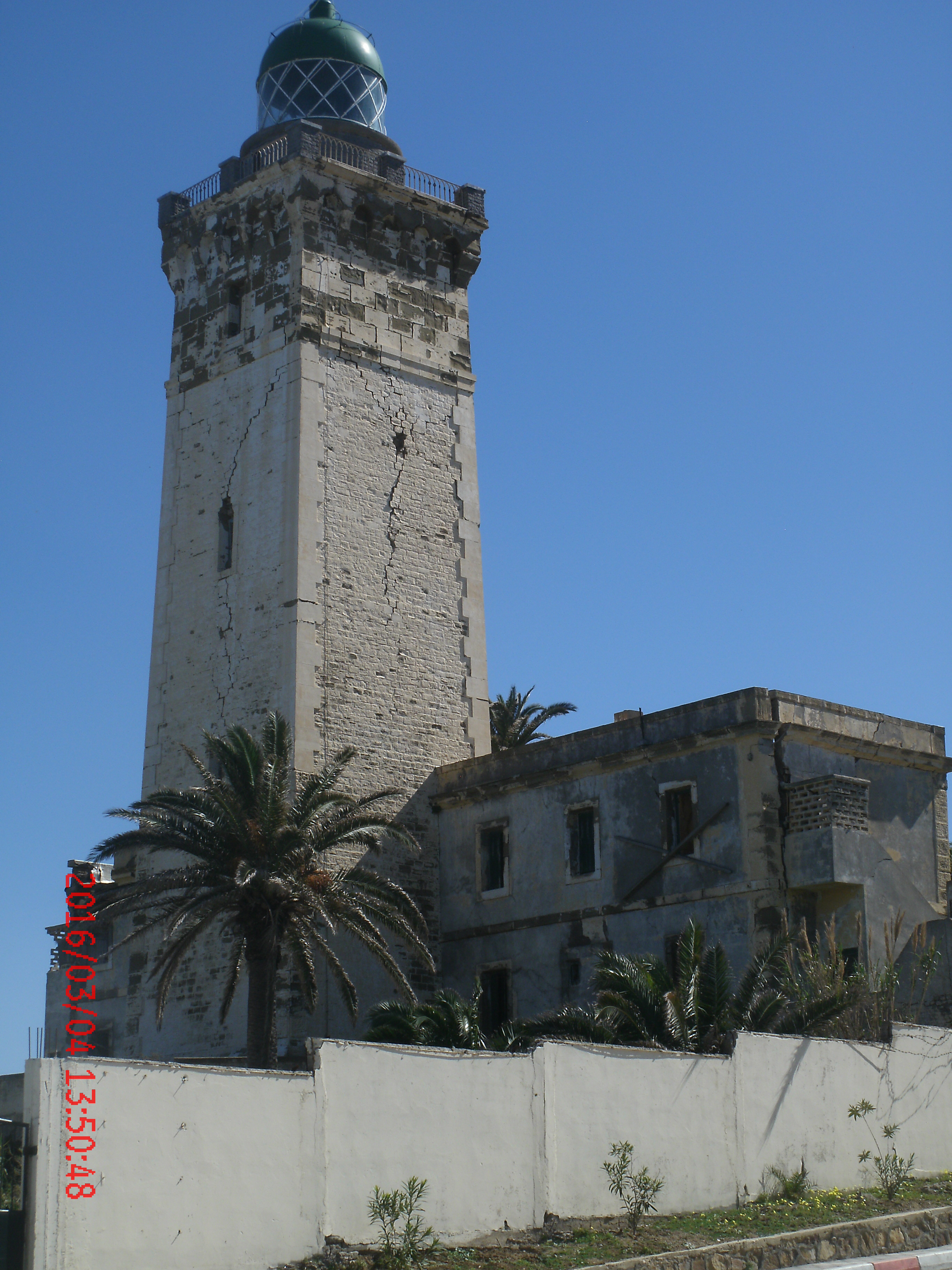
- Constructed: 1881
- Construction: masonry tower
- Height: 29 m (95 ft)
- Shape: quadrangular tower with balcony and lantern
- Markings: White (tower), green (lantern)
- Deactivated: 2003

Dellys (Arabic: دلّس, Berber: Tadallis) is a small Mediterranean town in northern Algeria's coastal Boumerdès Province, almost due north of Tizi-Ouzou and just east of the Sebaou River. It is the district seat of the daïra of Dellys. The town is 45 km from Tizi Ouzou, 50 km from Boumerdès (the provincial capital), and about 100 km from the capital Algiers.

It is notable for its Ottoman-era Casbah, two colonial-era lighthouses (marking Cape Bengut), and some beaches; the principal activities of the area are fishing and farming.

As of 2008, the population of the municipality is 32,954.

== Geography ==
The Dellys area presents a natural harbour in the form of a small bay sheltered on the west and northwest by the peninsula of Sidi Abdelkader (largely occupied by the town cemetery, along with a small lighthouse). This peninsula is the seaward extension of the mountain of Assouaf, looming over the town. Around this harbour grew the Casbah of Dellys. During the colonial period the town grew southwards, as the port was expanded; a technical school, the École des arts et métiers, was also built to the north, near the cemetery. Expansion further up the mountain was prevented by the preservation of the Bou-Arbi forest; instead, the town's growth after independence in 1962 was mainly concentrated in two "wings" on each side of it.

To the south, former agricultural areas on the mountain slopes were built up with apartment buildings to form the new suburb Nouvelle-Ville, still surrounded by farmland on both sides. To the west, the relatively level Ladjenna (or "Les Jardins") area, with rocky coasts, consisted mainly of family gardens and small farms until the mid-twentieth century, but is now largely built up. It includes the tiny fishing port of El-Kouss; Cape Bengut, the northernmost land in the region, marked by a larger lighthouse; and the rock promontory of Sid El-Medjni. Further west, the village of Takdempt, at the mouth of the Sebaou river, remains marginally separated from Dellys proper.

The municipality has a total of 678 hectares of forest, most of it accounted for by Bou-Arbi above the old town (74 hectares, Aleppo pine), Assouaf above the Ladjenna suburb (50 hectares, thuya and degraded maquis), Achtoub (290 hectares, brush), and an area around Takdempt (250 hectares, brush).

== Locations, districts and hamlets ==
In addition to its seat, Dellys proper, the Dellys District is composed of the following localities: Ain Salem, Takdempt, Sidi El Medjni, Ladjenna, Bordj Fnar, Beni Azeroual, L'Assouaf, Lemchachka, Thouabet, Boukmach, Bouafia, Brarat, Dar El Melh (Les Salines), Boumedas, Ouled Mahdjoub, Béni Amara, Tizeghouine, Dar Rabah, Ouled Sabeur, Chegga, Mezoudj, Houasna, Azrou, Afir, Amadhi, Thissira, Ifri Tamarth, Ivehlal (Bhalil), Thala Ayache, Thala Arousse, El Marssa Tofaha.

These are divided among three municipalities: Dellys itself, Aafir to the east, and Ben Choud to the south.

== Demographics ==
Historical population
Year	Population
1901	14,000
1926	17,000
1954	21,600
1966	10,300
1987	29,700; 16,100 (municipality)
1998	19,500 (municipality)
2008	32,954 (municipality)

== Postcode ==
From independence in 1962 to 1984, Dellys was part of the Wilaya of Tizi Ouzou, and each wilaya had a single postcode, in this case 15000.

After the administrative division of Algeria in 1984, Dellys was attached to the newly created wilaya of Boumerdès, whose postcodes started with 35; the Daïra of Dellys was indicated by a following 1 (351xx), its chief town (Dellys) with the number 0 (3510x), and its town centre with a further 0, giving the town centre of Dellys the complete postal code 35100.

In 2008, Dellys was given the new postcode 350043 as part of the restructuring undertaken by Algérie Poste.

== History ==
=== Prehistoric ===
The Dellys area has been inhabited since prehistoric times; archeological finds in the area include Iberomaurusian remains, a Neolithic polished axe, and (at Takdempt) some dolmens and covered alleys.

=== Antiquity ===
Dellys first entered written history as the Phoenician colony of Rusucurru or Rusuccuru, known to the Greeks as Rhousoukkórrou (Ancient Greek: ῾Ρουσουκκόρρου). (A few authorities instead identify the ancient Rusucurru with Tigzirt.)

Rusuccuru became part of the Roman Empire about 42 CE with Claudius' annexation of the Kingdom of Mauretania, and was subsequently promoted to the rank of municipium after the suppression of Aedemon's revolt. The town's regional importance in the Roman province of Mauretania Caesariensis was sufficient that inscriptions in the nearest towns, Iomnium to the east (modern Tigzirt) and Cissi to the west (modern Djinet), were dedicated to Rusucurru's genius loci.

With the advent of Christianity, Rusucurru became a suffragan bishopric, variously known as Rusucurium, Rusucurrum, and Rhusuncorae; it was the birthplace of the Christian martyr Marciana (d. 303). The town survived Firmus' revolt in 373–375, as witnessed by attestations of the names of its later bishops:

- Fortunatus (mentioned in 411)
- Optatus (a Donatist mentioned in 411)
- Ninellus (mentioned in 419)
- Metcum (mentioned in 484, exiled by Huneric)

However, it disappears from written sources during later centuries.

=== Medieval ===
Under the name of Tedelles, the town reappears in the 12th century as the final refuge of the last Banu Sumadih emir of Almería in Spain, Mu'izz ud-Dawla ibn Sumadih, who was granted land there by the Hammadid dynasty after fleeing the advance of the Almoravids.

After a period of prosperity, it was hard hit by the wars of the 14th century between the Hafsid, Merinid, and Zayyanid kingdoms, changing hands no less than 12 times between 1285 and 1373. The town (then in Zayyanid hands) was also sacked by a Valencian and Majorcan fleet in 1398, following a raid on Torreblanca.

After 1438, Dellys came under the rule of the Thaaliba family of Algiers.

=== Early Modern ===
With the arrival of Oruç and Hayreddin Barbarossa in the 16th century, Dellys became part of the Ottoman Empire; they initially made the town their eastern headquarters. The Casbah of Dellys in its current form dates back in large part to this period, while also reflecting earlier periods with its urbanistic styles.

=== French colonization ===
In 1830, France decided to invade. On 15 May that year, as their fleet prepared to attack, one French brig was shipwrecked near Dellys (main article: Shipwreck of Dellys). Within a couple of months France had occupied Algiers, beginning the process of French colonization of Algeria.

Dellys, however, would remain independent for a few years longer. The first French attack on the town came in 1837, in the wake of the First Battle of the Issers. In the same year, French expansion was temporarily put on hold by the Treaty of Tafna, in which France recognized Emir Abdelkader's authority over most of western Algeria. Areas east of Algiers, including Dellys, soon swore allegiance to Emir Abdelkader, who appointed Ahmed bin Salem to lead the district. In 1839 Emir Abdelkader visited Dellys in person as part of a tour of his eastern frontiers, urging the inhabitants to prepare themselves for war rather than to place their trust in saints' tombs. The war did indeed resume that very year, following a French violation of the treaty further south at the Iron Gates.

On 12 May 1844, French troops under the command of Bugeaud made a second assault on Dellys, finally occupying the town. A European quarter was then built immediately south of the Casbah. The town was bisected by the road which would eventually become the RN24. The troops turned the town's principal mosque into a military hospital on arrival, replacing it with a new one nearby which they completed in 1847.

In 1871, Cheikh Mokrani led much of eastern Algeria in an attempt to end French rule. The tribes surrounding the town of Dellys, the Beni-Thour and Beni-Slyem, joined in this revolt. On 22 April they laid siege to Dellys proper, where the French garrison managed to retain control with help from passing warships. On 18 May, a column led by Lallemand arrived from the west and broke the siege. In the wake of the revolt's failure, much of the agricultural land surrounding Dellys was confiscated and given to French settlers, notably at Sidi Daoud and Baghlia. Mokrani's defeat, and the hardships that followed it, marked the end of organized military resistance to French rule in the region for almost three generations.

During the Second World War, Dellys hosted a wireless communication training school for the French air force, where female volunteers were trained in radio operation and maintenance.

=== Algerian Revolution ===
Like the rest of Algeria, Dellys was engulfed in the Algerian War of Independence from 1954 to 1962.

This commune saw the creation of several clandestine torture centers during the Algerian revolution:

- Camp Gualota in the commune of Dellys.

=== Independence ===
Algeria became independent in 1962; during the following decades, the town grew substantially.

The 2003 Boumerdès earthquake caused significant damage, notably to the Casbah and Nouvelle-Ville.

On 8 September 2007, a suicide car bomb attack on the naval barracks in the port, claimed by AQIM, took at least 30 lives.

== Health ==
The Dellys hospital is the main health structure in the municipality of Dellys. This public hospital establishment (E.P.H.) of Dellys has a technical capacity of 150 beds as well as an organized capacity of 162 beds distributed as follows:

- Internal medicine (male/female): 67 beds.
- Maternity/gynecology: 32 beds.
- Pediatrics: 32 beds.
- General surgery: 31 beds.

== Transport and roads ==
Dellys is connected to the rest of the country through two main roads:

- RN 24, a coastal road leading to Algiers in the west (via Djinet) and Béjaïa in the east (via Aafir and Tigzirt)
- RN 25, providing a southward connection via Baghlia to Tizi-Ouzou.

From 1894 to ca. 1935, a railway line connected Dellys to Mirabeau (modern Draâ Ben Khedda).

At present there are three long-distance bus destinations: Dellys-Algiers; Dellys-Boumerdès; and Dellys-Tizi Ouzou.

== Economy ==
Dellys has an agricultural land and mixed port (fisheries and trade).

The port of Dellys, built in 1925, is now almost completely saturated with ships docking at its level. To remedy this situation, those in charge of the sector have decided to redevelop it.

In fact, in addition to the reinforcement work carried out after the 2003 earthquake, a dredging operation to correct its water level has been launched.

Its fleet is made up of 11 trawlers, 32 sardine boats and 150 small crafts.

== Sports ==
As elsewhere in Algeria, football (soccer) is popular; Dellys-born footballers include Abderrahman Ibrir, former manager of the Algerian national team, and Rachid Nadji, a striker for MC Oran. The local team is the Union sportive de Dellys (USD); before independence, it was called the Association sportive de Dellys (ASD), founded in 1921. The town is equipped with a stadium capable of holding up to 7,000 people.

== Ecclesiastical titles ==
Although no bishop has resided in Dellys for well over a millennium, and no church currently exists in the town, the Catholic Church nevertheless added the bishopric of Rusuccuru (the town's Latin name) to its list of titular sees in 1933. In Latin the titular bishopric is known as Rusuccurrensis.

The Ancient diocese has had the following incumbents, all Latin Church and of the lowest episcopal rank:

- Dennis Walter Hickey (1968.01.05 – 1999.10.06)
- Kevin Joseph Farrell (2001.12.28 – 2007.03.06)
- Marek Mendyk, Auxiliary Bishop of Legnica (2008.12.24 – ...)

== Notable people ==
- Habib Ayyoub, writer
- Abderrahmane Benhamida, former Minister of Education
- Abderrahmane Hammad, athlete
- Mokhtar Hasbellaoui, doctor
- Abderrahman Ibrir, footballer
- Marciana of Mauretania, Christian martyr
- Rachid Nadji, footballer
- Sidi Yahya al-Tadallisi al-Thaalibi, imam
- Jean Raoux, general
- Mu'izz ud-Dawla ibn Sumadih, ruler
- Georges-Fernand Widal, physician
- Abdelkader Zerrar, Algerian footballer.

== See also ==
- List of lighthouses in Algeria
