= Algérois =

Region in north Algeria

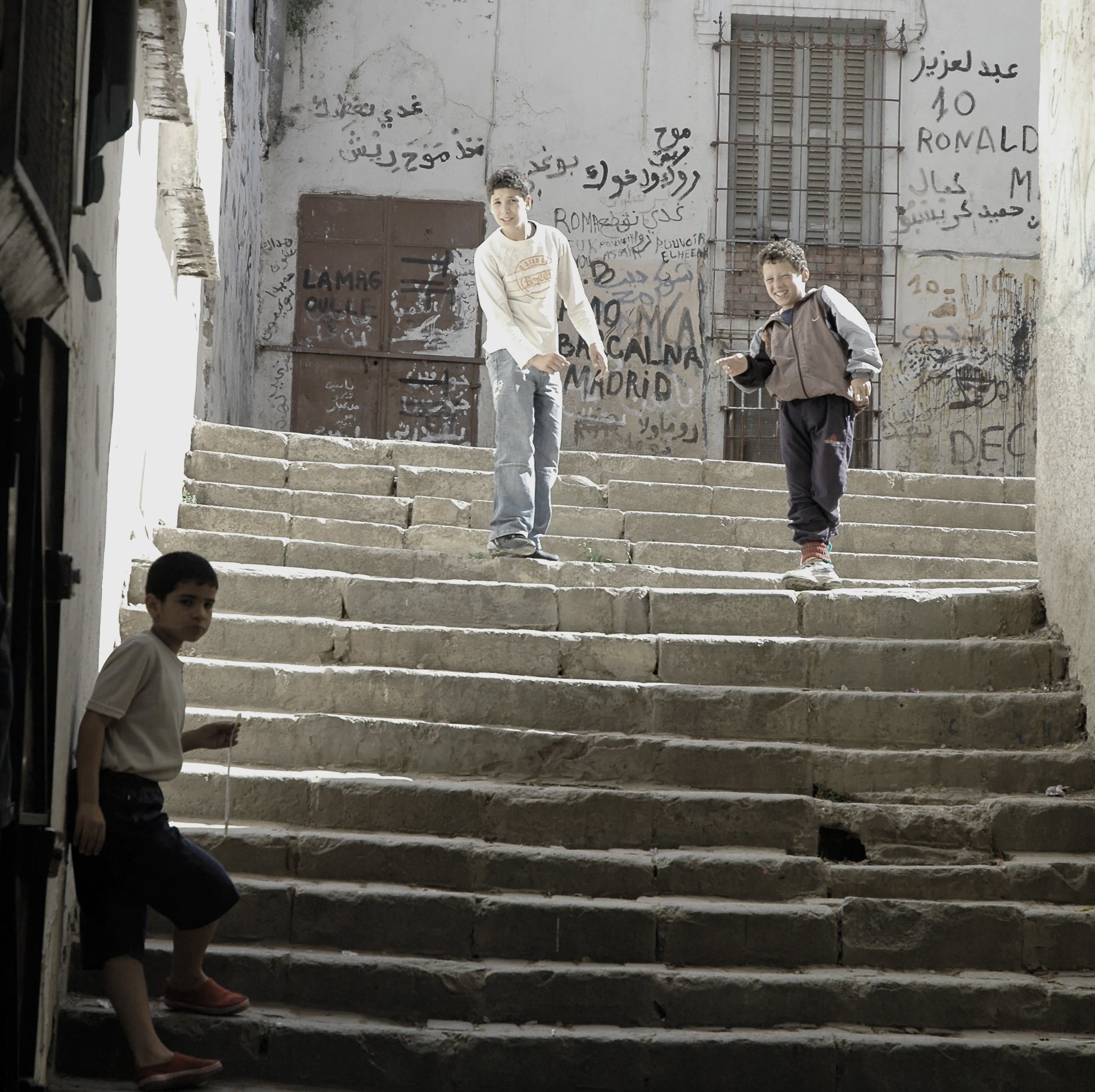
Casbah of Algiers

Algérois is a cultural region of the Maghreb, located in north-central Algeria.

== Geography ==
The region corresponds roughly to the following wilayas:

- Algiers Province
- Aïn Defla Province
- Blida Province
- Boumerdès Province
- Chlef Province
- Médéa Province
- Tipaza Province
- Tissemsilt Province
- Tizi Ouzou Province

The capital of the region is the city of Algiers.

== See also ==
- Culture of Algeria
