= Habib Ayyoub =

Algerian writer

Habib Ayyoub حبيب أيوب
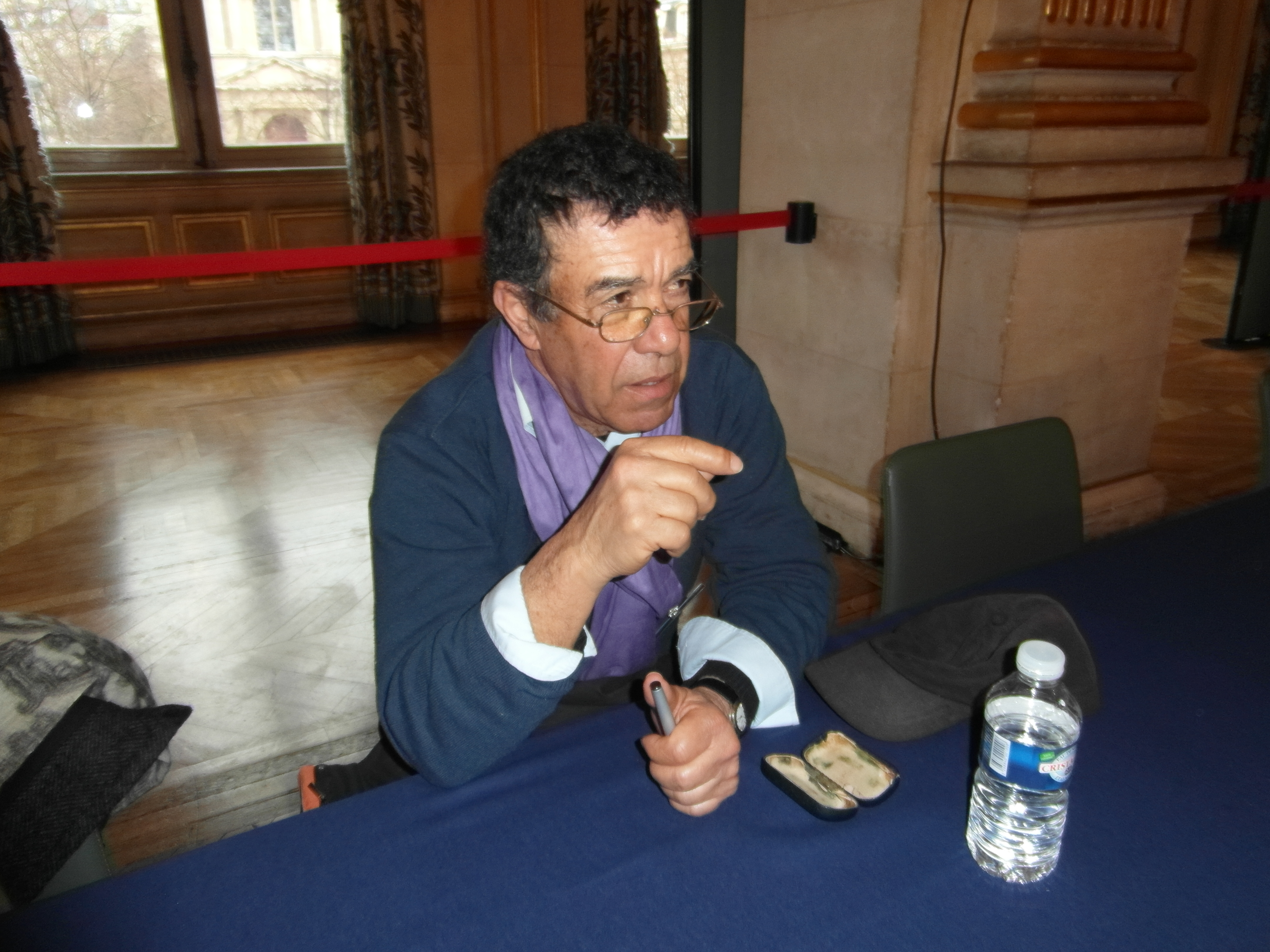
- Habib Ayyoub at the 20th Maghreb des Livres book fair, Paris, 2014.
- Born: Abdelaziz Benmahdjoub; 15 October 1947; Takdempt, Algeria
- Occupations: novelist, journalist
- Writing career
- Language: French
- Notable work: Le Gardien
- Notable awards: 2003 : Mohammed Dib Prize for C'était la guerre; 2013: "Escales" Prize for Le Remonteur d'Horloge (Barzakh)

Habib Ayyoub (real name Abdelaziz Benmahdjoub, born 15 October 1947 in Takdempt) is an Algerian writer, journalist, and film-maker, notable for his novels in French. He lives in Dellys.

== Biography ==
After studying sociology, then filmmaking at the INSAS in Brussels, he became a correspondent of Le Jeune Indépendant, then economic journalist at Liberté.

He then made a few short films before going on to publish his first books: Le Désert et après and Le Gardien (published by Barzakh Editions) in 2002. Le Gardien tells the story of a soldier posted to a remote settlement in the desert.

Two of his works have been translated into Italian: Il guardiano (Le gardien) and Il regolatore di orologi (Le remonteur d'horloge).
