= Rezki Zerarti =

Algerian painter (1938–2024)

- Born: 24 July 1938; Taourga, French Algeria
- Died: 15 December 2024 (aged 86)
- Known for: Painting
- Style: Visual artist
- Website: Rezki Zerarti on Facebook

Rezki Zerarti (Kabyle: Rezqi Zerarti; 24 July 1938 – 15 December 2024) was an Algerian painter. His works were largely of the cubist style.

== Biography ==
Rezki Zerarti was born on 24 July 1938 in Taourga within lower Kabylia during the period of French Algeria, and left during the Algerian War in 1959 to the town of Aix-en-Provence in France where he worked as a mason, before starting to follow a few drawing lessons, and the same year he began to paint.

He returned to Algeria after Independence in August 1962, and settled in the district of Pointe-Pescade (Raïs Hamidou) in Algiers, and opened his painting studio in the vicinity of the accommodation of the poet Jean Sénac who met him in 1963.

Zerarti died on 15 December 2024, at the age of 86.

== Exhibitions ==
Zérarti took part in the two “Algerian Painters” exhibitions organised in Algiers for the “Fêtes du 1er novembre 1963” then in Paris in 1964.

His first personal exhibition was presented at Galerie 54 in 1964, and prefaced by Sénac.

He became a member of the UNAP, he participated in its salons and from 1967 to 1971 in the events of the group "Aouchem" (Tattoo) which brought together a dozen artists, poets and painters, notably with Baya, Denis Martinez and Choukri Mesli.

After a long absence from the art scene for nearly twenty years, Zerarti resumed exhibiting his paintings in 1999.

== Awards ==
In 1972, he received the first prize for the “10th anniversary of Independence” and in 1979, the second prize for the “25th anniversary of November 1, 1954”. In 2003, he obtained the 1st prize in the competition organized by the Asselah foundation.

== See also ==
- List of Algerian people
- List of Algerian artists
