= 2007 Dellys bombing =

Terrorist incident in Algeria

2007 Dellys bombings
- Location: Dellys, Algeria
- Date: September 8, 2007
- Attack type: suicide bombing
- Deaths: 30
- Injuries: 47
- Perpetrator: Al-Qaeda in the Islamic Maghreb

The 2007 Dellys bombing occurred on September 8, 2007, when at least 30 people were killed and 47 injured in a suicide car bomb attack on an Algerian naval barracks in the town of Dellys, 100 km (62 mi) east of Algiers. The blast was carried out by two attackers, who both died. Al-Qaeda's North African wing, al-Qaeda in the Islamic Maghreb, claimed responsibility for the attack.

== See also ==
- Terrorist bombings in Algeria
