= Mokhtar Hasbellaoui =

Algerian politician

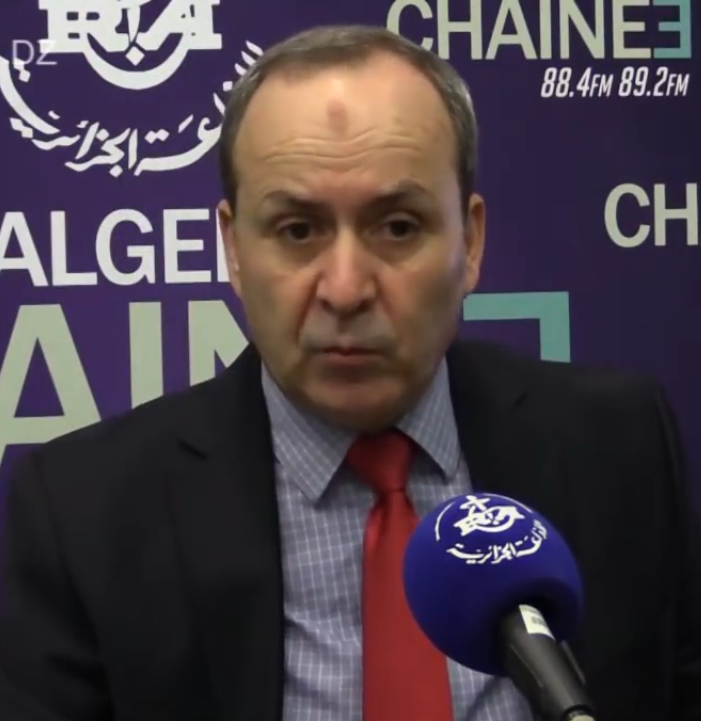

Minister of Health, Population and Hospital Reform
- In office 25 May 2017 – 1 April 2019
- President: Abdelaziz Bouteflika
- Prime Minister: Abdelmadjid Tebboune
- Preceded by: Abdelmalek Boudiaf
- Succeeded by: Mohamed Miraoui

Personal details
- Profession: Doctor

Mokhtar Hasbellaoui (or Hazbellaoui) (born 21 September 1963 in Algiers, Algeria), is an Algerian doctor and political figure. Between 25 May 2017 and 1 April 2019, he had been Algeria's Minister of Health, Population and Hospital Reform.
