= Second Assault of Dellys =

1844 French assault in Algeria

Second Assault of Dellys (1844)
- Part of the French conquest of Algeria
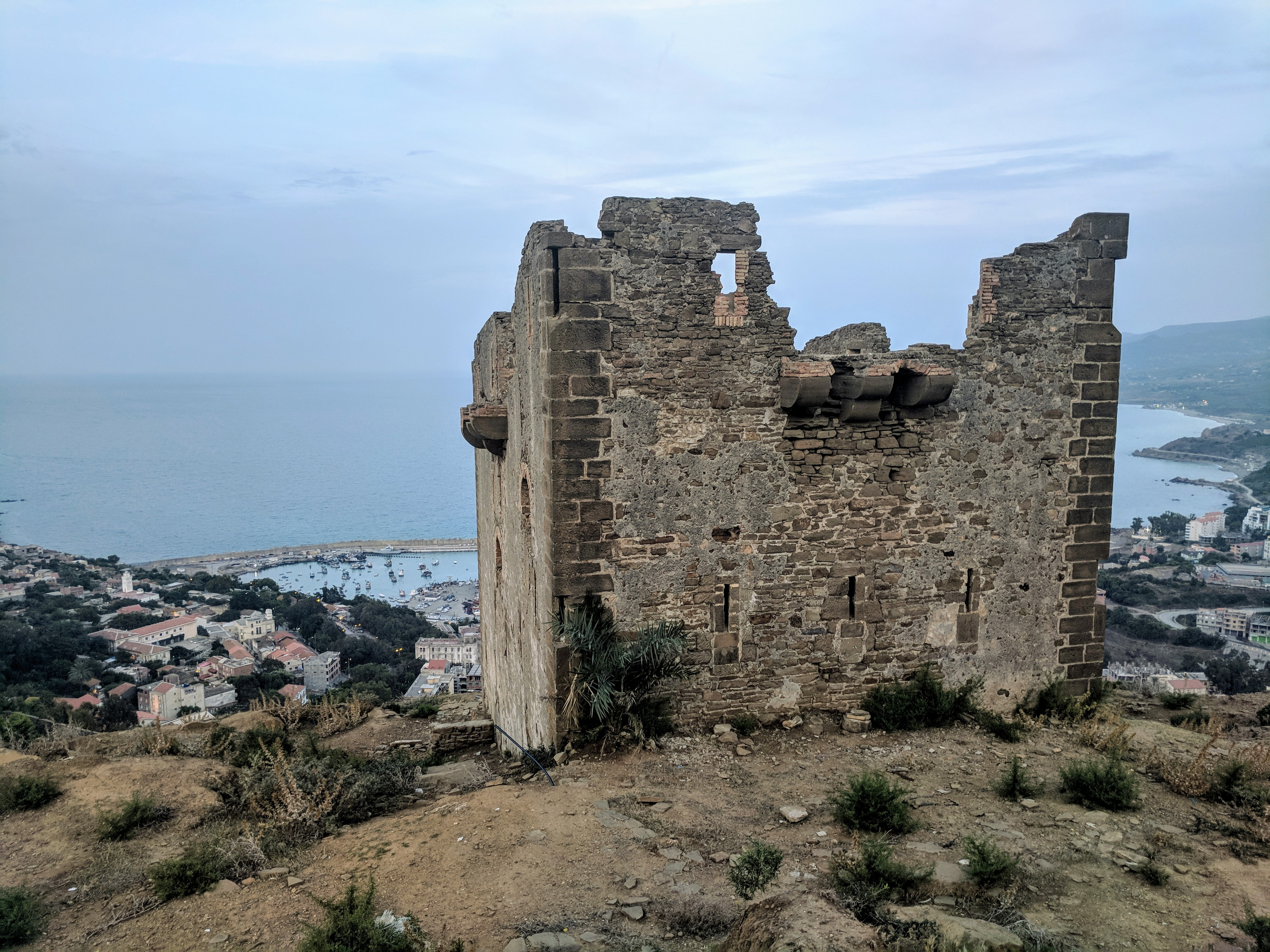
- Qubba of Sidi Soussan overlooking Dellys.
Date	25 April – 27 May 1844
Location	Dellys, Kabylia, Algeria 36.915789°N 3.9146904°E
Result	French victory

Belligerents
Emirate of Abdelkader; Kingdom of Kuku; Islamic Zawiyas; Rahmaniyya	Kingdom of France

Commanders and leaders
Emir Abdelkader; Ahmed bin Salem; Ali ben Zamoum	(France) Bugeaud (France) Périgot (France) Daumas (France) Gentil (France) Mahieddine

Strength
Kabyles; 10,000 resistants	Troupes coloniales; French Navy; 8,000 soldiers

Casualties and losses
500 killed	3 killed

The Second Assault of Dellys was an assault by French troupes coloniales under General Thomas Robert Bugeaud (1784–1849) against the Algerian resistance fighters in the town of Dellys, Kabylia of the Igawawen. It was part of the French conquest of Algeria and took place in April–May 1844.

== Historical context ==
During combat against Algerian resistance fighters, Marshal Bugeaud, whose military efforts were mainly focused on the pursuit of Emir Abdelkader (in the Titteri massif south of Mitidja first, and then in the region of Orania), could not ignore that Algiers was threatened in the east by independent tribes singularly close together in a mountainous region called Kabylia.

By the fall of 1842, Bugeaud had conquered the region surrounding Oued Sebaou, the administration of which he had handed over to the loyal Khalifa Madani bin Mahieddine. His management was often disturbed by the independent Kabyles tribes in the neighborhood who obeyed Khalifa Ahmed bin Salem, subservient to Emir Abdelkader, who had taken refuge in the mountains of Khachna and Djurdjura.

Dellys, about 90 km (56 mi) along the coast from Algiers, had not submitted to French colonial power. This prompted Marshal Bugeaud to plan a military campaign against the strategic location on the Algerian coast.

== Ultimatum ==
Marshal Bugeaud preceded this conquering expedition of Dellys by a proclamation on 14 April 1844 addressed to the chiefs and marabouts of the seven Kabyle tribes east of the Col des Beni Aïcha and the Issers. The seven tribes targeted by this ultimatum were the Flissas, Amraouas, Beni Khalfoun, Nezliouas, Gechtoulas, Ouled El Aziz and Harchaouas. This proclamation summoned the Kabyles to submit to the French, for the Algerian country once ruled by Emir Abdelkader, was now and henceforth dominated by colonial France, and that these mountain tribes were the only ones who had not yet manifested themselves by joining the French government.

The Marshal told them that he could have conquered Kabylia with a strong army a long time ago, but he had not done so because he wanted to give them time to think about it and opt for surrender. He ordered them to submit to the French and immediately drive out the khalifa Ahmed bin Salem from the Kabyle mountains unless he came to ask for and receive mercy from the French king. Bugeaud reprimanded them for not having taken any account of his previous warnings, and not having approached the French through their neighbors, Issers and Khachna. He reminded them that they had welcomed the rebel Ahmed bin Salem into their home with what was left of his regular troop, despite their complaints that he had brought theft, raid, and murder since he had settled in Kabylia. Bugeaud reiterated to them that he could not tolerate this state of affairs in Kabylia any longer and that he had decided to conquer this region and to march against these tribes if they did not come to find him at his place in the camp set up on the bank of the Oued Isser to capitulate. The Marshal ordered them to drive Ahmed bin Salem out of their region and submit, otherwise, he would enter their mountains with his soldiers, burn their villages and crops, and cut down their fruit trees in retaliation.

== Kabyle challenge ==
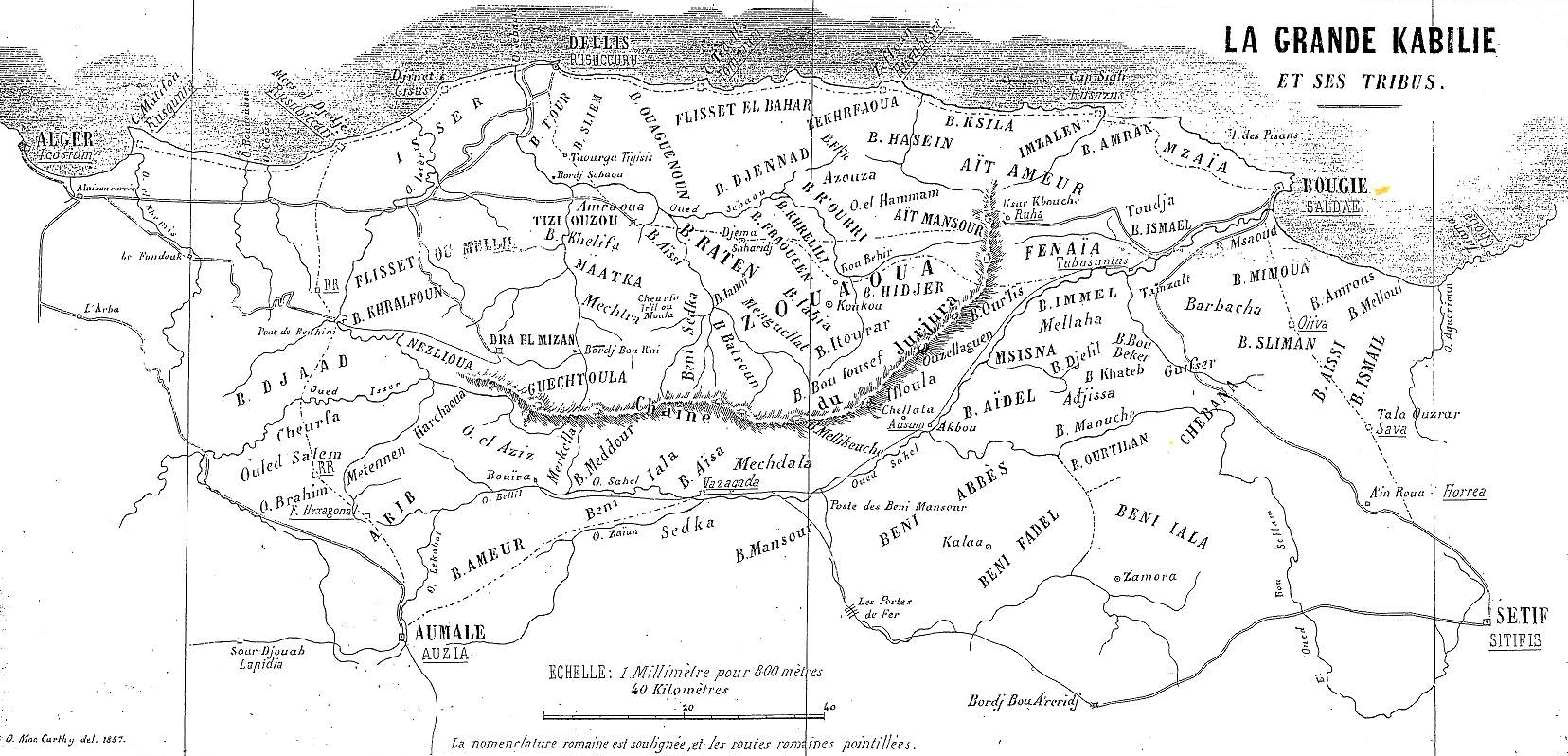
Kabylia

The marabouts of Zawiyet Sidi Amar Cherif and the other zawiyas immediately summoned all their tribes, the great landowners and the wealthy people who favored submission because they knew that Bugeaud was relentless, and they feared that the whole burden of the war would fall on them. On the contrary, the artisans and farmers demanded war with loud cries, and a middle ground was taken by deciding that before resorting to arms, they would send a letter and request a calling for justice from Governor Bugeaud in Algiers. Bugeaud responded with a new ultimatum dated 21 April 1844 in which he set out his grievances against the Kabyles, whom he summoned immediately to submit or endure the pain of being treated as enemies.

On receipt of this second message of threats, the neighboring Kabyle tribes were summoned to the Flissas, and a devoted national feeling dominated all considerations of particular interest, and it was thus that the Kabyles prepared to fight. The great assembly which had gathered the tribes saw the reading of the second letter of Bugeaud several times, before it was solemnly declared that there was no question of surrendering to the French without having heard the powder of the guns.

== Military column ==
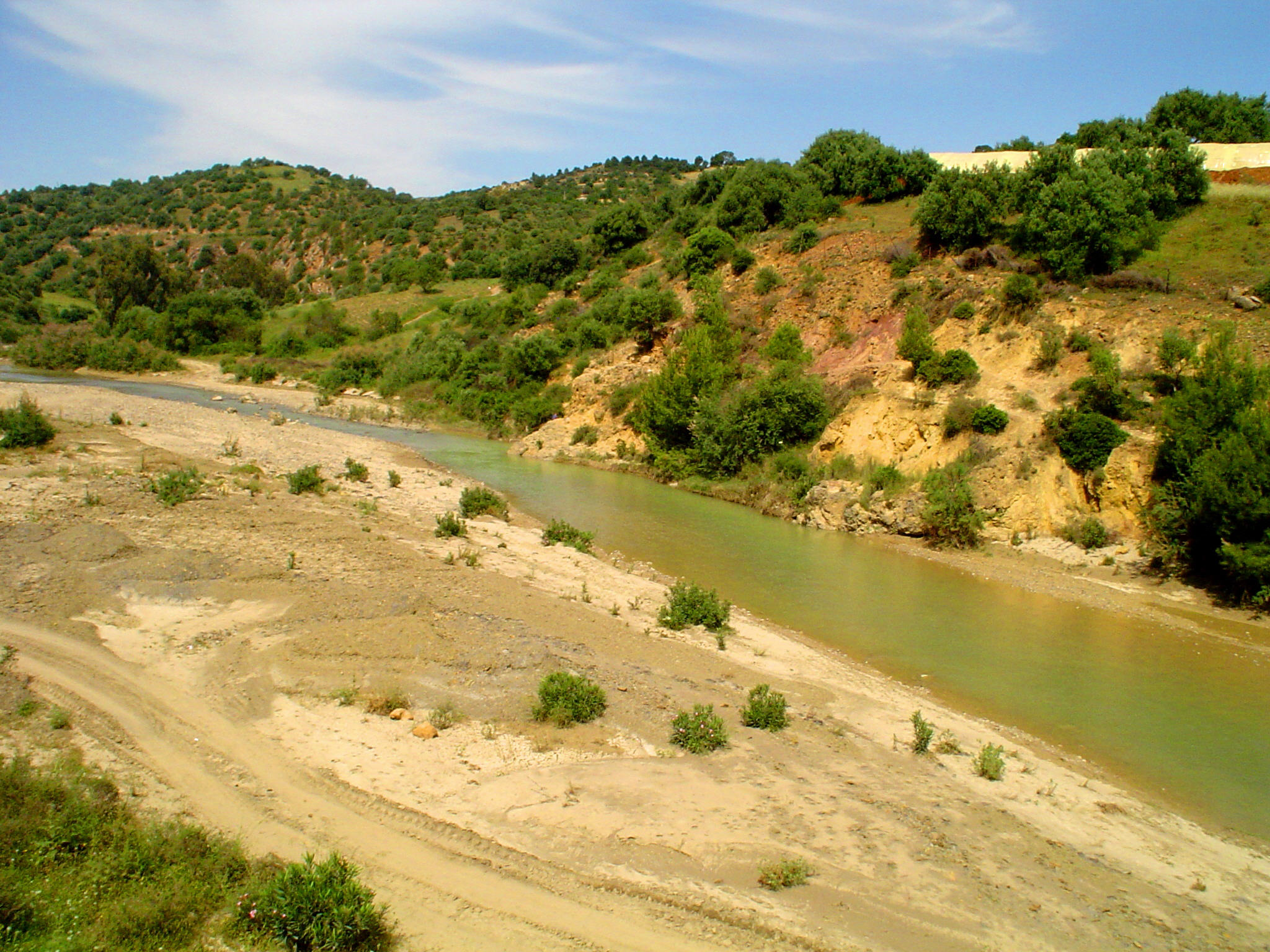
Isser River

Marshal Bugeaud ordered on 25 April 1844 an expeditionary military column towards Dellys after becoming aware of the Kabyle challenge. The day of the assembly was fixed for the next day of 26 April after several postponements due to heavy spring rains. The column was made up of eight thousand men of all arms who camped at El Harrach (Maison-Carrée) while awaiting their departure, which would take on the appearance of a party, with the thousand mules and camels who were gathered for the occasion. The expeditionary column encountered more than one difficulty in its march from Mitidja to the Col des Beni Aïcha, because it had to cross muddy terrain soaked by the recent spring rains. The movement of the convoy was done in short days because of the considerable number of soldiers who marched together, while Marshal Bugeaud had decided to take to the sea his base of operations on a ship.

Thousands of soldiers then camped successively on the edge of Oued Hamiz (Oued Khamis), then on the Oued Corso after crossing the course of the Oued Boudouaou, before settling on the left bank of the Oued Isser in descending from the Col des Beni Aïcha. During this punitive march, the named vassal of the French Khalifa Ben Mahieddine came to join the French column at the head of numerous auxiliary forces (goumis).

The rain which poured during the night caused the Isser River to overflow, which the column could not cross on the first day, and it was thus that the soldiers were stopped on the bank for forty-eight hours until the recession of the waters. The Issers region had been abandoned by these goumis who rallied to Mahieddine because they had feared the incursions of the Kabyle mountain people who were preparing a serious night attack in the French camp blocked by bad weather. The outposts of the column were accordingly prepared to retaliate against the assailants, and they lined the right bank of the river without any attempted attack being reported against them.

== Assault of Dellys ==
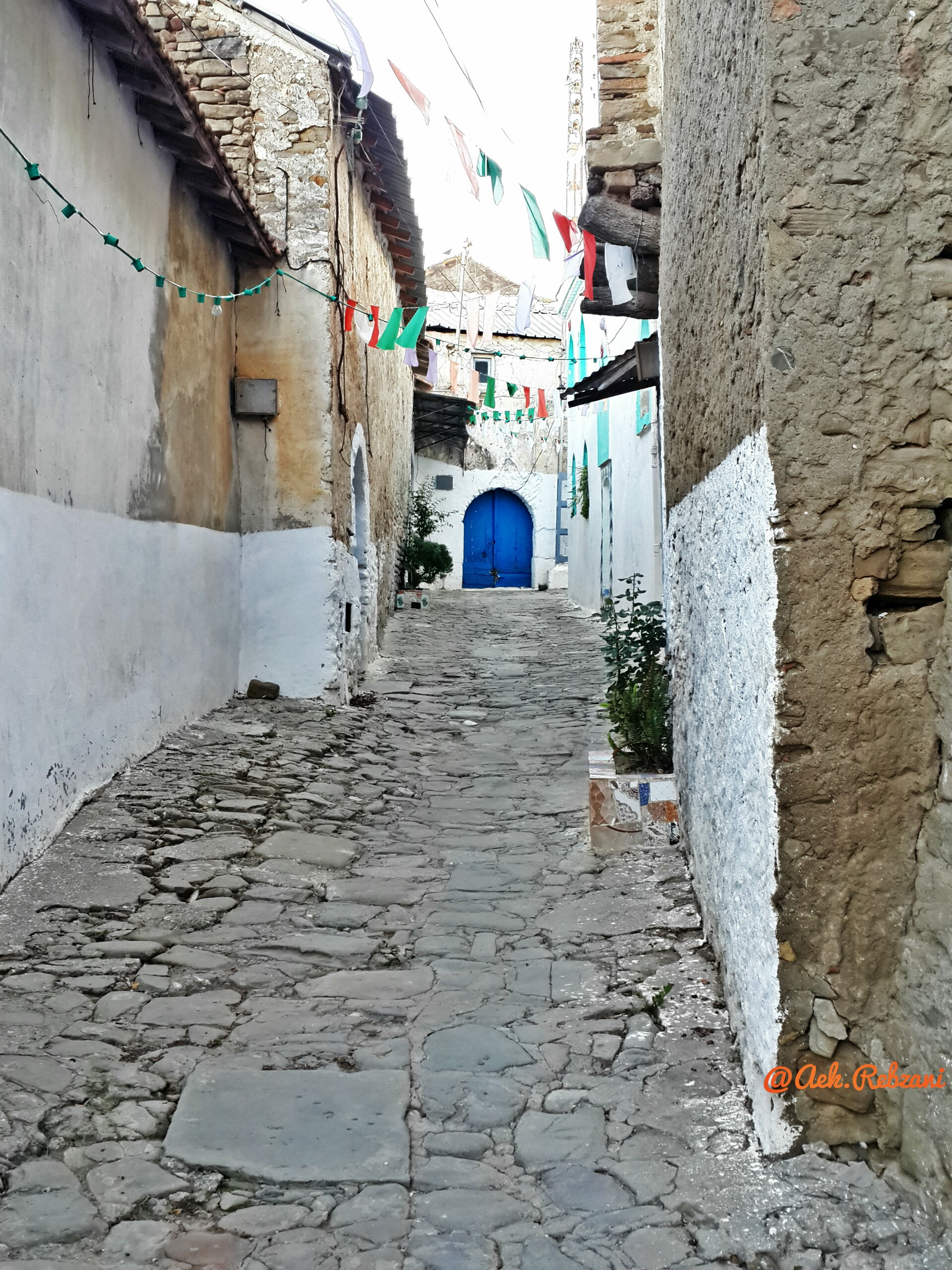
Casbah of Dellys

After two weeks of sustained march to cross the Mitidja and the Issers mountains, the troops of Marshal Bugeaud arrived on 7 May at the gates of the town of Dellys, which they took possession of. Bugeaud then began by marking the sites necessary for a definitive establishment of a French colony in this Moorish town of Dellys which was previously built on the ruins of an ancient Roman city. It was only half of the column that had been sent by the Marshal to help him take possession of Dellys and load a convoy there before returning to Bordj Menaïel's camp.

The Marshal had premeditated the occupation by sea of the small town and the port of Dellys to make it his supply point, and he had arranged to meet with the four thousand fatassins who had joined him, to the boats at the royal navy steamer. Bugeaud had based himself on information, revealing the existence of an easy road communication between the port Dellys and the site of Bordj-Menaïl, and it is thus that he decided to build in this last strategic position of Bordj Menaïel a central supply depot that the lightened French military columns would use to conquer the Flissas mountains. The Marshal had in the meantime carried out development work in the Casbah of Dellys which he had occupied without any resistance, and whose guard was left in the guard of a few companies under the orders of Captain Marie-Théodore Périgot (1807–1888).

The soldiers of the military engineering then began to quickly erect the shelters and buildings necessary for the sailors of the French Navy who were going to accumulate supplies, as well as all the beasts of burden of the column which was going to take a considerable load for the needs of soldiers in Bordj Menaïel. These preliminary operations of fitting out the future trading post of Dellys were carried out relentlessly, because the Marshal had to set off without ceasing to join his waiting camp at Bordj Menail, and then undertake a vigorous offensive against the Kabyles of Flissas.

After the stabilization of the military situation in Dellys, Captain Périgot, of the 2nd infantry tirailleurs company, was officially appointed senior commander of the town, and he was given 100 native infantrymen, 1 mountain artillery section and 40 soldiers of military engineering, with a captain and a lieutenant.

== Battle of Taourga ==
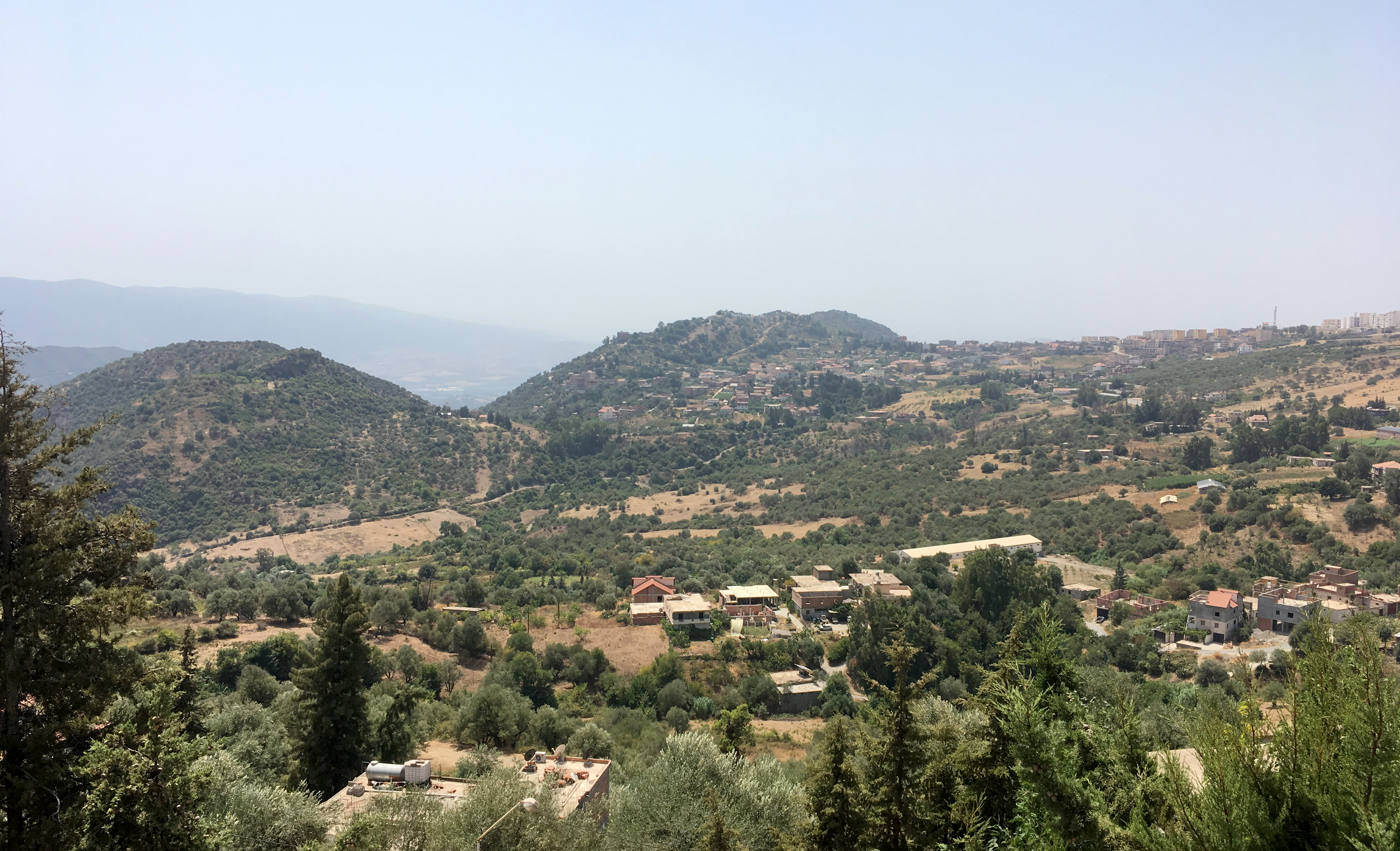
Taourga

When the weather improved and the rain stopped in the valley of Oued Sebaou, General Bugeaud then left the Dellys bastion on the day of 10 May 1844 to set out again to face the threat of the Kabyles of the great tribe of Flissas north of Taourga mountain. It was indeed about 10,000 Kabyle fighters who gathered in the hinterland of Dellys, in a threatening troop to counter the arrival of Bugeaud who went up the valley of Sebaou to Souk El Thenine, where his colonial troops were going to deposit their heavy luggage, and thus lighten up to be able to cross again the course of the Sebaou and climb to the assault of the heights of Taourga. Bugeaud's plans were to set up his headquarters at Bordj Menaïel to oversee the conquest of great Kabylia, but the Flissas had meanwhile entrenched themselves in four fortified villages belonging to the Amraouas and engaged in combat against the French.

The Kabyles did not want at all costs that Bugeaud could cross Taourga to go and settle in Bordj Menaïel, but Lieutenant-Colonel Eugène Daumas (1803–1871) launched against them five French battalions with the allied Zouave goumis. A company of voltigeurs were surrounded and embarrassed in a difficult path, then was assaulted on all sides, and only narrowly escaped complete destruction because around it was engaged the strongest of the fight.

Shortly after, the Kabyles ceded the ground to French and eventually withdrew, leaving more than 500 dead in the villages and ravines, before being chased in their flight. Bugeaud was waiting in the meantime for the arrival of General Jean-François Gentil (1789–1852) with a military column which would allow a counter-offensive to be carried out, the outcome of which would be the submission of Kabylia.

== Cease fire ==
The great Kabyle tribe of the Flissas made its submission to Marshal Bugeaud on 21 May 1844 after the defeat of the Algerian resistance fighters, while until then it had stubbornly remained rebellious and indomitable.

At the sound of the cannon of the capitulation, the named Ali ben Zamoum, who is the grandson of the illustrious rebel leader Mohamed ben Zamoum, received from the French the burnous of his investiture as Agha responsible for the management and monitoring of peace in the plain of Issers. Two other Kabyle tribes then also submitted, and the Confederation of Flissas then apologized for having fought the French with Ahmed bin Salem who fled at the start of the battle by releasing his allies in this region.

== Peace talks ==
The ceasefire was followed by a semblance of a peace treaty contracted between the Kabyles of Flissas and the troops of Bugeaud in order to withdraw the colonial reinforcements from the lands of the conquered tribes. The Kabyle then vouched that Ahmed bin Salem will no longer reappear in the mountains of Khachna and Djurdjura, and that they will therefore be faithful to their word given to the French.

In the course of the discussion of their financial and economic interests after the end of the confrontations, the Kabyle leaders asked Bugeaud to be exempt from paying tax to the French, on the pretext that since the birth of the kingdom of Kuku, they had never acquitted themselves nor had paid taxes neither to the Algerians of the Emirate of Abdelkader nor to the Turks and janissaries of the regency of Algiers. But Bugeaud then replied that he was not basing himself on the situation which prevailed with Emir Abdelkader or with the Turks, and that currently the power of the kingdom of France is far more powerful than that of Dey Hussein in Algiers before his surrender and exile. The French thus demanded from the Kabyles that they are treated with equality like the French, and that they pay the tax in full like the others, and it was then that the Kabyles bowed their heads in resignation, approval and submission.

== Submission of the Amraoua ==
The city of Dellys having been pacified, Marshal Bugeaud then went up from the Mediterranean coast by the course of the Oued Sebaou towards the plain of Issers to then enter among the Amraouas who formed the last Kabyle tribe rebellious to colonial power. The Marshal's convoy then set up camp on the site of the dreaded battle of the previous 17 May, and representatives of the resigned and defeated Kabyle tribes flocked from all sides to pledge allegiance to the French victors. Unexpected Kabyle tribes even came to abdicate and capitulate when Bugeaud had no intention of attacking or submitting them because they had not participated in the resistance against the French.

The Kabyles capitulations then followed one another, and new investitures and surrenders took place to the sound of cannon and to the sound of military music which still sang during May 24 and 25. Ahmed bin Salem's own brother, the named Ben Omar, then presented himself to the Marshal to ask to be spared and to be able to live in this province as a simple particular subject.

== Retreat to Mitidja ==
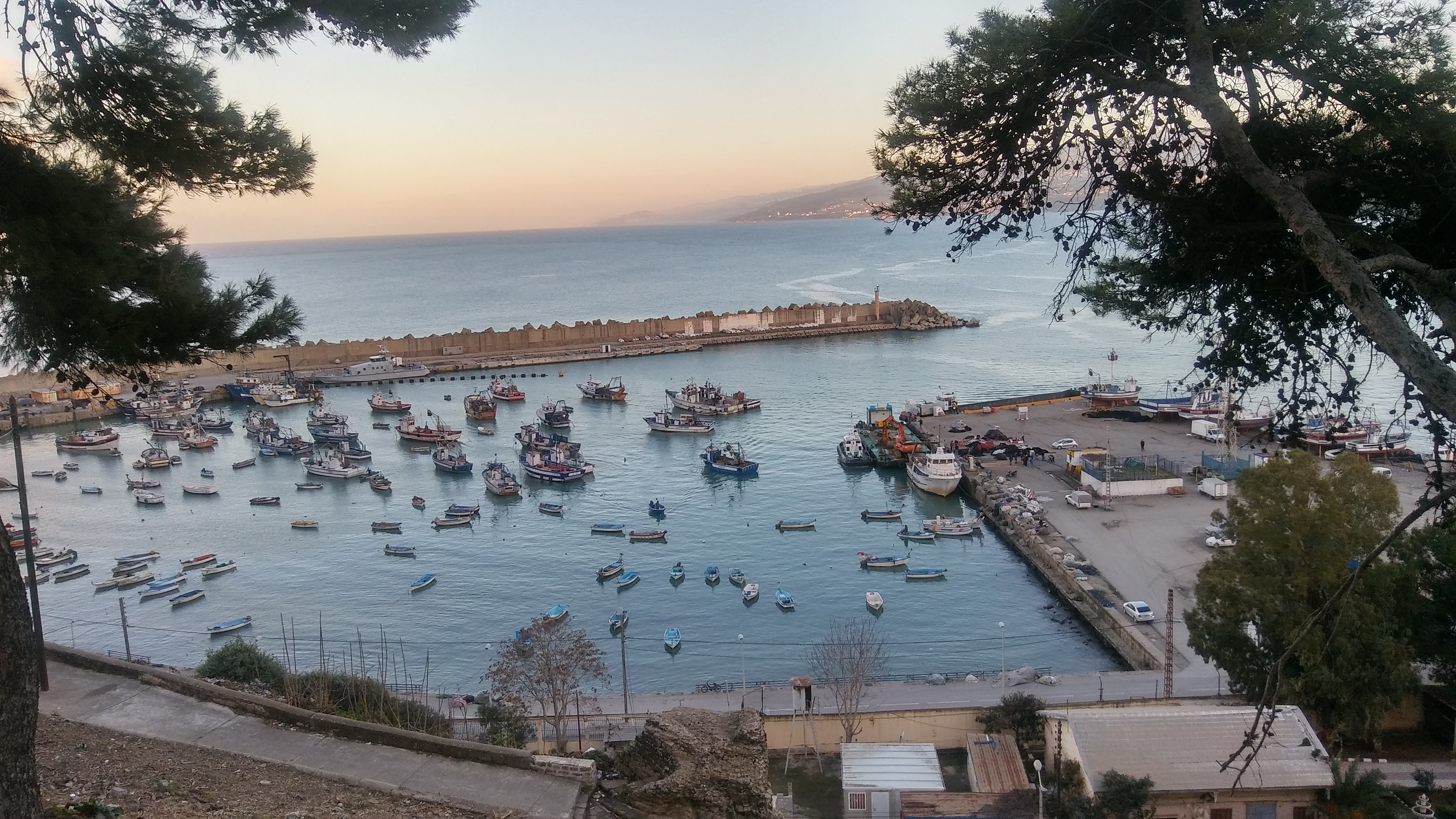
Port of Dellys

The colonial regiments which took part in the Dellys assault withdrew on 26 May 1844 by beginning their retreat movement on Mitidja after the end of hostilities. Marshal Bugeaud had given the orders to leave during this withdrawal three battalions of soldiers only at the level of the Col des Beni Aïcha in order to monitor and protect the road between the Algérois and the Algerian east.

== Boarding for Algiers ==
After the total submission of the city of Dellys in May 1844 by French troupes coloniales, Marshal Bugeaud then embarked at the port of Dellys and returned to the port of Algiers on the morning of 27 May to settle in his headquarters within the Casbah of Algiers.

== Consequences ==
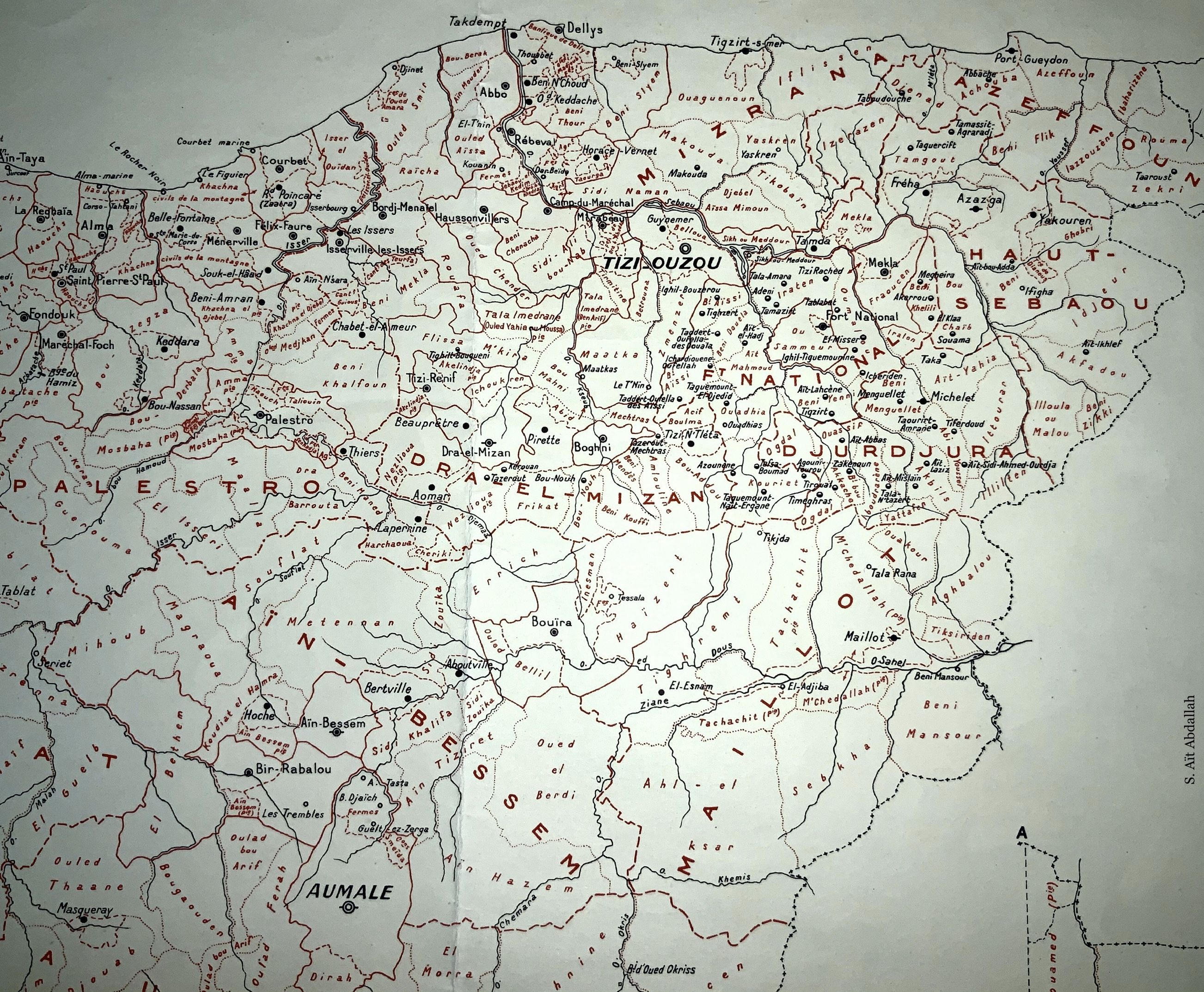
Igawawen tribes of Kabylia.

This is how this great French Army expedition against Kabylia ended on 27 May 1844, and which despite the human losses that followed, was in fact only a French military reconnaissance in hostile territory. Marshal Bugeaud then boasted in his official report of having extended by this battle of more than twenty leagues to the east the radius of the suburbs of Algiers, and of having added to the French domination a fertile and populated territory, and to have conquered vast and good lands for the future and imminent European colonization.

On both sides of the belligerents of this confrontation, the Kabyles and the French had dabbled, but there was still nothing decided for the future, for the outcome of this battle did not end than by adding a new trophy to the list of French victories in Algeria. Kabylia was in fact not yet fully conquered, and the reckless Kabyles had not made their lasting submission to the new masters of the Algérois. The best proof of this rebellion is that Marshal Bugeaud was again forced twice, in 1845 and in 1847, to recommence this expedition against the Kabyles of Khachna and Djurdjura.

== Gallery ==
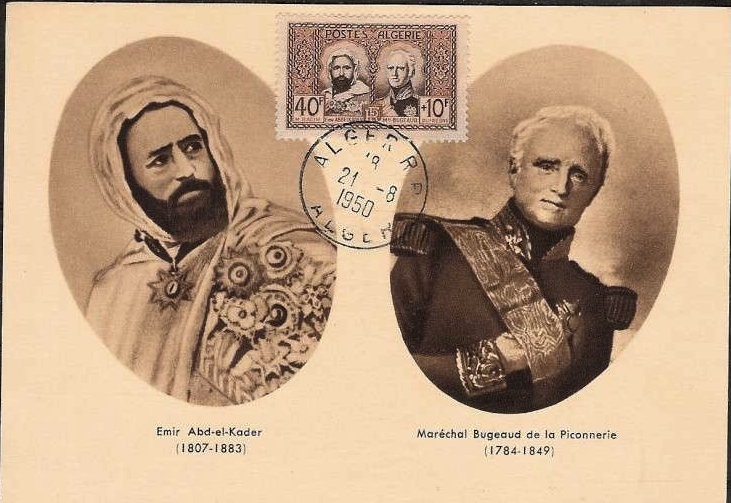
Emir Abdelkader (1808–1883) and Thomas Robert Bugeaud (1784–1849)

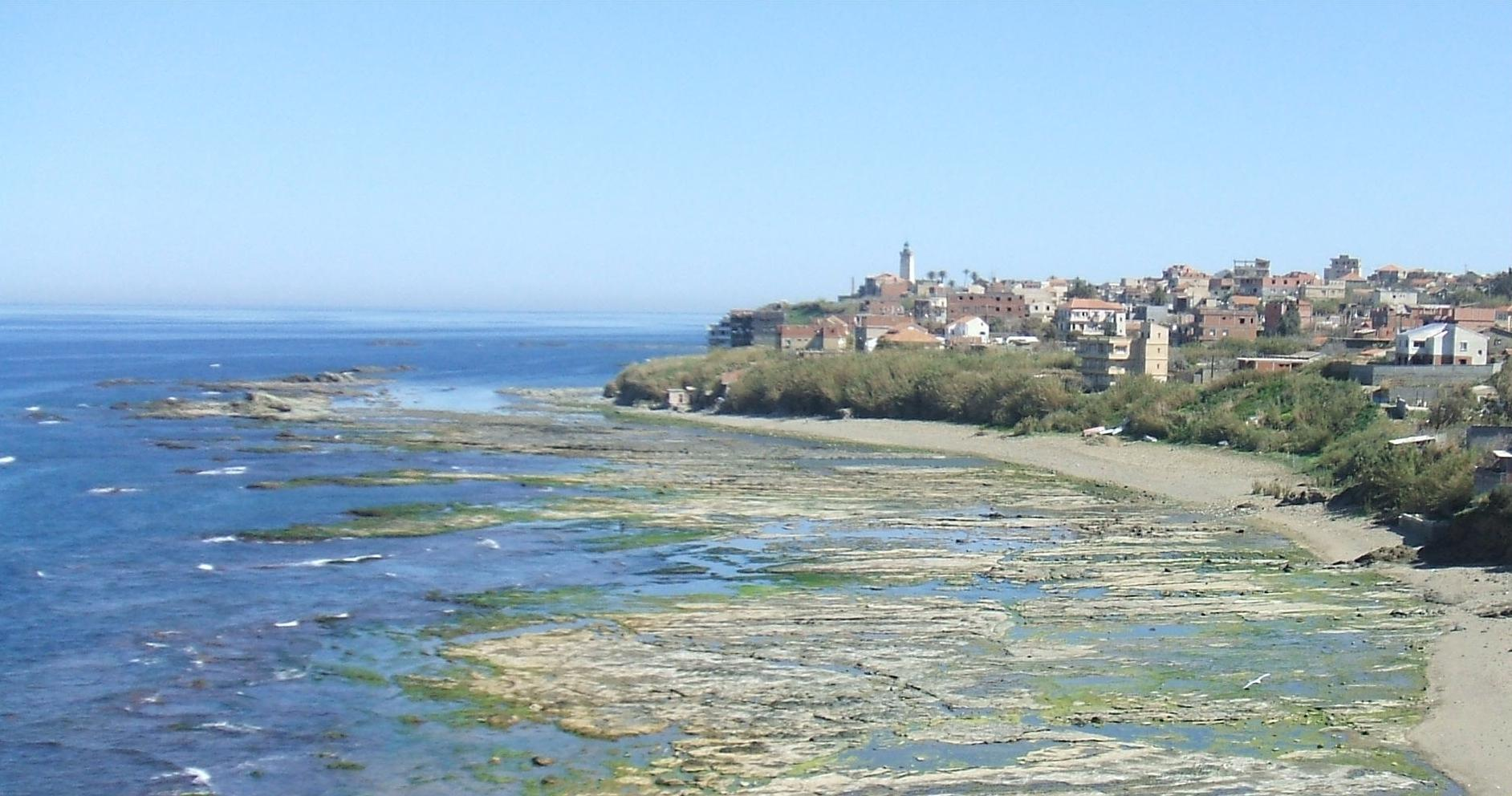
First Assault of Dellys (1837)

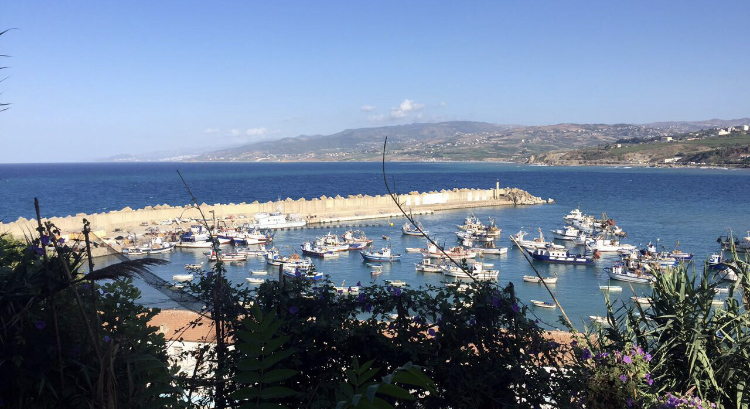
Port of Dellys

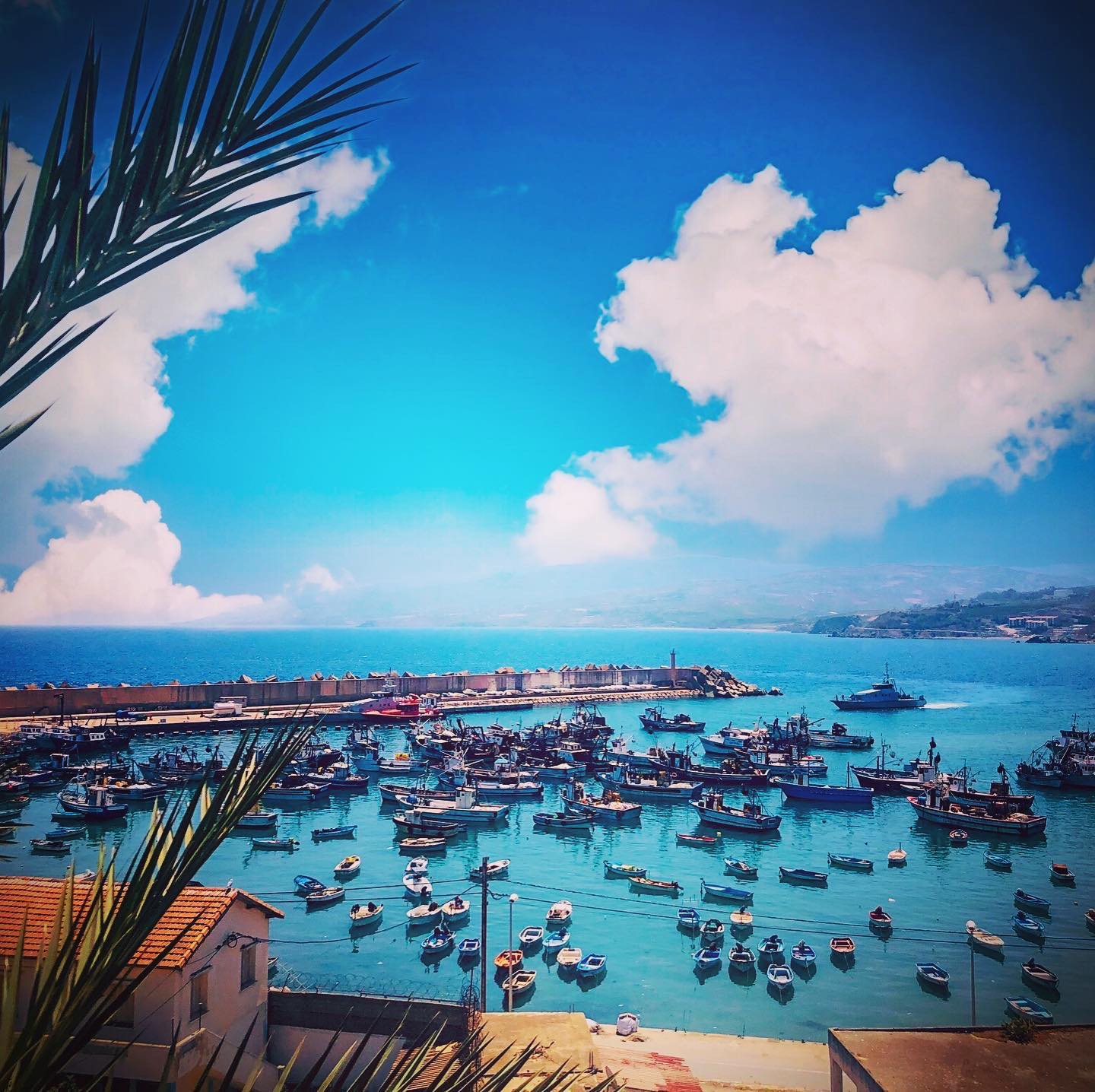
Port of Dellys

== See also ==
- French conquest of Algeria
- Kingdom of France
- Emirate of Abdelkader
- Emir Abdelkader
- Kingdom of Kuku
- Ahmed bin Salem
- Thomas Robert Bugeaud
- Mitidja
- Kabylia

== Bibliography ==
- Henri Amédée d'Ideville (1882). Le Maréchal Bugeaud: d'après sa correspondance intime et des documents inédits, 1784-1849, Volume 2. Paris: Librairie de Firmin-Didot et Cie. p. 485.
