= 2012 Baghlia bombing =

Car bomb Terrorist Attack on 29 April 2012 in Baghlia

Coordinates: 36.8180379°N 3.8580943°E

- Boumerdès Province highlighted within Algeria
- Location: (Algeria) Baghlia, Boumerdès Province
- Date: April 29, 2012
- Attack type: Bomb
- Injuries: 7
- Perpetrator: Al-Qaeda Organization in the Islamic Maghreb

The 2012 Baghlia bombing occurred on April 29, 2012 when a bomb detonated against a patrol of the Algerian police in the town of Baghlia, Boumerdès Province, Algeria injuring 7. The Al-Qaeda Organization in the Islamic Maghreb was suspected as being responsible.

== See also ==
- Terrorist bombings in Algeria
- List of terrorist incidents, 2012
