= August 2010 Baghlia bombing =

Car bomb Terrorist Attack on 18 August 2010 in Baghlia

Coordinates: 36.8180379°N 3.8580943°E

- Boumerdès Province highlighted within Algeria
- Location: (Algeria) Baghlia, Boumerdès Province
- Date: August 18, 2010
- Attack type: Bomb
- Deaths: 3
- Injuries: 5
- Perpetrator: Al-Qaeda Organization in the Islamic Maghreb

On August 18, 2010, a bomb was detonated against a convoy of the Algerian People's National Armed Forces in the town of Baghlia, Boumerdès Province, Algeria, killing 3 and injuring 5. Al-Qaeda in the Islamic Maghreb is suspected as being responsible.

== See also ==
- Terrorist bombings in Algeria
- List of terrorist incidents, 2010
