= Ben Choud =

Coordinates: 36°51′44″N 3°52′50″E

- Commune and town
- Country: Algeria
- Province: Boumerdès Province

Population (1998)
  - Total: 8,853
- Time zone: UTC+1 (CET)

Ben Choud is a town and commune in Boumerdès Province, Algeria. According to the 1998 census, it had a population of 8,853.

== History ==
- First Battle of the Issers (1837)
