= Baghlia =

Baghlia بغلية
- Commune and town
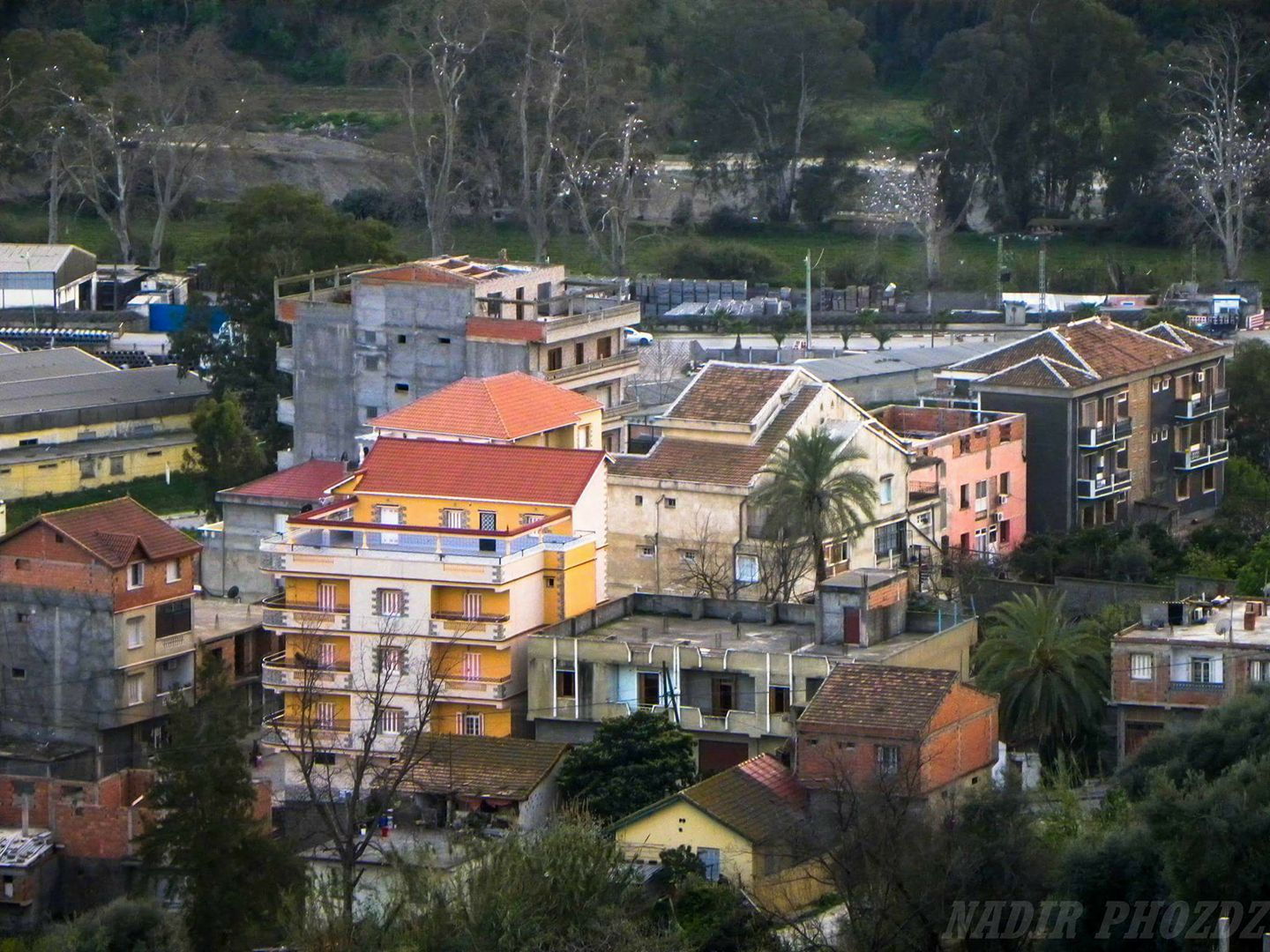

- Location within Algeria
- Country: Algeria
- Province: Boumerdès Province

Population (1998)
  - Total: 15,854
- Time zone: UTC+1 (CET)

Baghlia (Arabic بغلية) is a town and commune in the Baghlia District of Boumerdès Province, Algeria. According to the 1998 census it has a population of 15,854.

During the colonial period, it was given the name of Rébeval, after Napoleonic general Joseph Boyer de Rébeval.

== History ==
=== French conquest ===
- Expedition of the Col des Beni Aïcha (1837)
- First Battle of the Issers (1837)
- Battle of the Col des Beni Aïcha (1871)

=== Salafist terrorism ===
- August 2010 Baghlia bombing (18 August 2010)
- 2012 Baghlia bombing (29 April 2012)

== Notable people ==
- Lounés Bendahmane, footballer
