= 2007 Algiers Government Palace bombings =

Terrorist attacks in Algiers, Algeria

Algiers Government Palace bombings
- Location: Algiers, Algeria
- Date: 11 April 2007
- Attack type: Suicide car bombings
- Deaths: 33
- Perpetrator: Al-Qaeda

The Algiers Government Palace bombings occurred on 11 April 2007 when two suicide car bombs exploded in the Algerian capital Algiers.

The headquarters of the Algerian prime minister were hit by a large explosion that left many people dead and injured and could be heard 10 km away. Another explosion targeted a police station in an eastern suburb of the city, near the international airport.

Al-Qaeda claimed responsibility for the bombings.

== Details and context of the bombings ==
The first attack, which was on the prime minister's office, killed 12 people and injured 118, and the second attack on the police station in the Bab Ezzouar district of Algiers killed 11 and injured 44. Al-Qaeda in the Islamic Maghreb claimed responsibility for the attacks. This group was formerly known as the Salafist Group for Preaching and Combat (GSPC).

The United Nations Security Council held an official meeting to condemn the attacks. The attack was planned by Sofiane el-Fassila.

== See also ==
- Algerian Civil War
- Terrorist bombings in Algeria
