= Zawiyet Sidi Amar Cherif =

School in Algeria

- زاوية سيدي أعمر الشريف
- Other names: زاوية سيدي داود
- Type: Zawiya
- Established: 1745 CE / 1158 AH
- Founders: Sidi Amar Cherif
- Affiliations: Ministry of Religious Affairs and Endowments
- Religious affiliation: Qadiriyya - Rahmaniyya
- Location: Sidi Daoud, Kabylia, Boumerdès Province, 35019, Algeria; 36.8570451°N 3.8245646°E
- Language: Arabic, Berber

Zawiyet Sidi Amar Cherif (Arabic: زاوية سيدي أعمر الشريف), or Zawiyet Sidi Daoud, is a zawiya school located in Boumerdès Province in Algeria.

== Construction ==
The zawiya was built in 1745 in the eastern heights of the current town of Boumerdès in the Kabylia region. It was founded by scholar Sidi Amar Cherif.

== Missions ==
The zawiya is considered a prominent religious teacher for teaching the Quran and its basic rulings to young people. It also provides the various mosques of Boumerdes Province during the month of Ramadan every year with a preservation that leads to Tarawih prayers by reciting the Quran with the Warsh recitation.

This zawiya has had dozens of male and female Hafiz graduates.

It is a place to study and teach the Quran, as well as providing aid to the needy and those about to get married and organizing circumcision ceremonies.

It is one of the Zawiyas in Algeria that plays an important role in social life in the Sidi Daoud region. It is considered a modernized school, as it is based on the traditional and modern way of teaching the Quran and Sunnah as well.

== French conquest ==
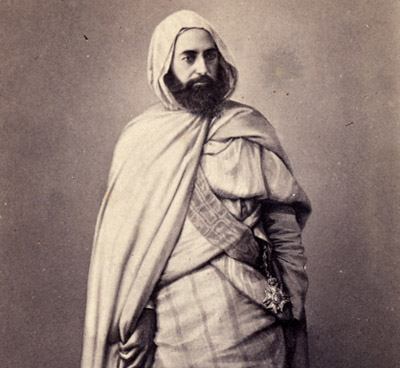
Emir Abdelkader (1808–1883)

When the French landed in Algiers during 1830 and the period of Ottoman Algeria gave way to an African state dislocated and invaded by colonial troops of the invading French Army, the zawiya of Sahel Bouberak could no longer be satisfied with their level of education in Sufism. Therefore, Cheikh Cherifi soon allied with Cheikh Ben Zamoum to counter the advance of French colonial appetites towards Kabylia and the valleys of Oued Isser and Oued Sebaou until 1837.

The turn of military events in Mitidja ended in 1837 with a recurrence of conflict. The Emirate of Abdelkader, represented by his younger brother Emir Mustapha (Bey in Beylik of Titteri), with murids of the zawiyas of Lower Kabylia, organized a surprise attack on 8 May 1837 on a large agricultural farm in Reghaia managed by the two colonists Mercier and Saussine.

This zawiya, affiliated with the Rahmaniyya brotherhood, played a crucial role (along with the Sheikhs of Zawiyet Sidi Boushaki and Zawiyet Sidi Boumerdassi) in triggering the Kabyle response against colonial expansion east of the Casbah of Algiers.

The looting and sacking of the farm bordering the Khachna Massif could not leave the belligerents in a situation of calm and ceasefire. Therefore, General Damrémont took advantage of this Algerian attack to raise the military forces stationed in Algiers under the direction of General Perregaux and Colonel Schauenburg to organize a punitive expedition against the Kabyles of the tribes of Beni Aïcha, Issers and Amraoua among the Iflissen Lebhar.

The Zawiyet Sidi Amar Cherif participated in unveiling the lure of peace with the French colonizers, who rushed at this opportunity to try to attack the Kabyles, starting 17 May 1837, which ended in failure on the bank of Oued Isser due to bad weather and ignorance of the escarpment of the hills of the Col des Beni Aïcha.

Cheikh Cherifi, Cheikh Ben Zamoum and Cheikh Boushaki took advantage of the defeat of the French soldiers to pursue them to their camp in Boudouaou on 25 May, but reinforcements arriving from Algiers ended up overturning the First Battle of Boudouaou in favor of the French, commanded by Captain Antoine de La Torré on 30 May.

The zawiya of Sidi Daoud entered fully into the resistance against the French conquest of Algeria and continued until the independence of Algeria in 1962.

== Notable people ==
- Sidi Amar Cherif
- Cheikh Mohamed Cherifi
- Mohamed Seghir Boushaki (1869–1959)
- Ali Boushaki (1855–1965)
- Abderrahmane Boushaki (1896-1985)
- Brahim Boushaki (1912–1997)
- Mehdi Boualem
- Ahmed Mebtouche
- Abdelkader Hammami
- Abdelkader Hasbellaoui
- Mohamed Hamek
- Cheikh Meddahi
- Cheikh Kezadri

== See also ==
- Algerian Islamic reference
- Zawiyas in Algeria
- Qadiriyya
- Rahmaniyya
- Emir Abdelkader
- Emir Mustapha
- Mokrani Revolt
- Messali Hadj
- Algeria War
- Sebaou River
- Raid on Reghaïa (1837)
- Expedition of the Col des Beni Aïcha
- First Battle of Boudouaou

== Bibliography ==
- Ferdynand Antoni Ossendowski (1800). Sous le fouet du Simoun. Paris: Ernest Flammarion, Éditeur. p. 193.
- Antoine-Ernest-Hippolyte Carette (1848). Exploration scientifique de l'Algérie pendant les années 1840, 1841, 1842. Paris: Imprimerie Royale. p. 192.
- Société historique algérienne (1871). Revue africaine, Volume 46. Algiers: Adolphe Jourdan, Libraire-Éditeur. p. 51.
- Société historique algérienne (1876). Revue africaine, Volume 115. Algiers: Adolphe Jourdan, Libraire-Éditeur. p. 208.
- Bulletin, Volume 22. Algiers: Société de géographie d'Alger et de l'Afrique du Nord. 1921. pp. 51–53.
- Cahiers nord-africains, Numéros 14 à 28. Paris: Études sociales nord-africaines. 1951. p. 27.
- Pierre Muraour (1956). Contribution à l'étude stratigraphique & sédimentologique de la Basse-Kabylie. Algiers: Service de la carte géologique de l'Algérie. pp. 80, 119.
- Bulletin - Service de la carte géologique de l'Algérie. Algiers: Service de la carte géologique de l'Algérie. 1956. pp. 80, 117, 120.
- Charles André Julien, Charles Robert Ageron (1964). Histoire de l'Algérie contemporaine. Paris: Presses universitaires de France. p. 286.
- Revue de L'Occident Musulman Et de la Méditerranée, Numéros 1 à 4. Algiers: Association pour l'étude des sciences humaines en Afrique du Nord. 1966. p. 24.
- Charles Robert Ageron (1972). Politiques coloniales au Maghreb. Paris: Presses universitaires de France. p. 264.
- Charles André Julien (1979). Histoire de l'Algére contemporaine, Volume 2. Paris: Presses universitaires de France. p. 286. ISBN 9782130356448.
- Rabah Saadallah (1981). El-Hadj M'hamed El-Anka: maître et renovateur de la musique "chaabi". Algiers: La Maison des Livres. p. 72.
- Littérature orale arabo-berbère, Numéros 13 à 15. Algiers: Ecole des hautes en sciences sociales. 1982. p. 66.
- Ahmed Hannache (1990). La longue marche de l'Algérie combattante (1830-1962). Algiers: Éditions Dahlab. p. 294.
- Mohamed Seghir Feredj (1999). Histoire de Tizi-Ouzou et de sa région: des origines à 1954. Algiers: Éditions Hammouda. pp. 70, 85, 107. ISBN 9789961890004.
- Kamel Chachoua (2000). Zwawa et zawaya. Paris: Ecole des Hautes Etudes en Sciences Sociales. p. 366.
- Mohamed Salhi (2006). Société et religion en Kabylie: 1850-2000, Volume 2. Algiers: Atelier national de reproduction des thèses. p. 792. ISBN 9782729563080.
- Jacques Bouveresse (2010). Un parlement colonial ? Les Délégations financières algériennes 1898-1945: Tome 2. Paris: Publications des universités de Rouen et du Havre. p. 481. ISBN 9782877754972.
