= First Battle of the Issers =

Battle in the French conquest of Algeria

- Part of the French conquest of Algeria
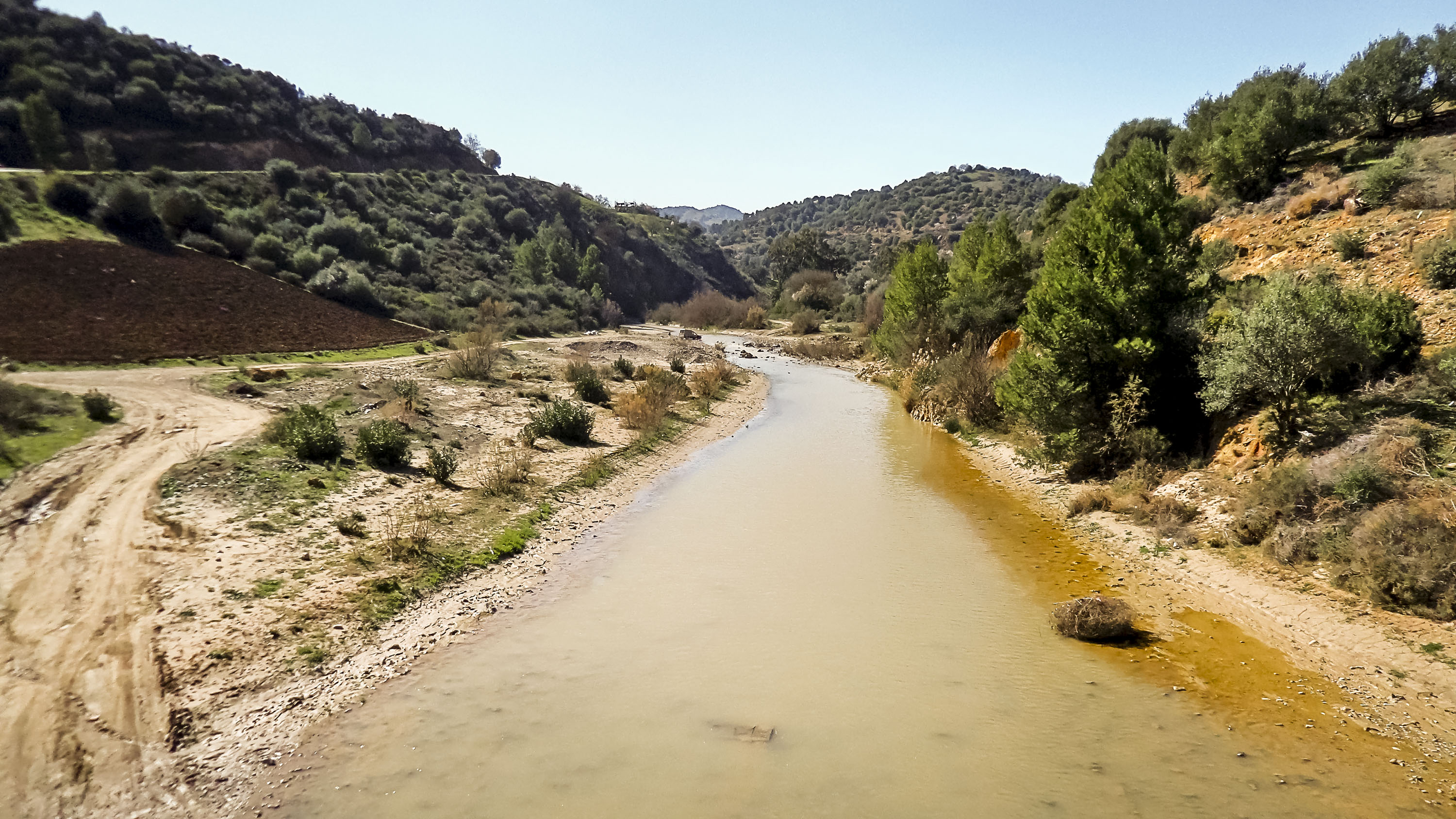
- River mouth of Oued Issers
Date	27–30 May 1837
Location	Issers, Kabylia, Algeria 36.7367021°N 3.665407°E
Result	French victory

Belligerents
Emirate of Mascara: (Libya) Islamic Zawiyas; Rahmaniyya	France

Commanders and leaders
Emir Abdelkader (Libya) Cheikh Ali Boushaki (Libya) Cheikh Ben Zamoum	(France) Damrémont (France) Schauenburg (France) Perrégaux (France) La Torré (France) Lixières

Strength
Kabyles: 4,000 warriors; 500 riders	Troupes coloniales: 5,000 infantrymen; 600 riders

The First Battle of the Issers in May 1837, during the French conquest of Algeria, pitted the troupes coloniales under General Perrégaux and Colonel Schauenburg against the troops of Kabylia of the Igawawen.

== Background ==
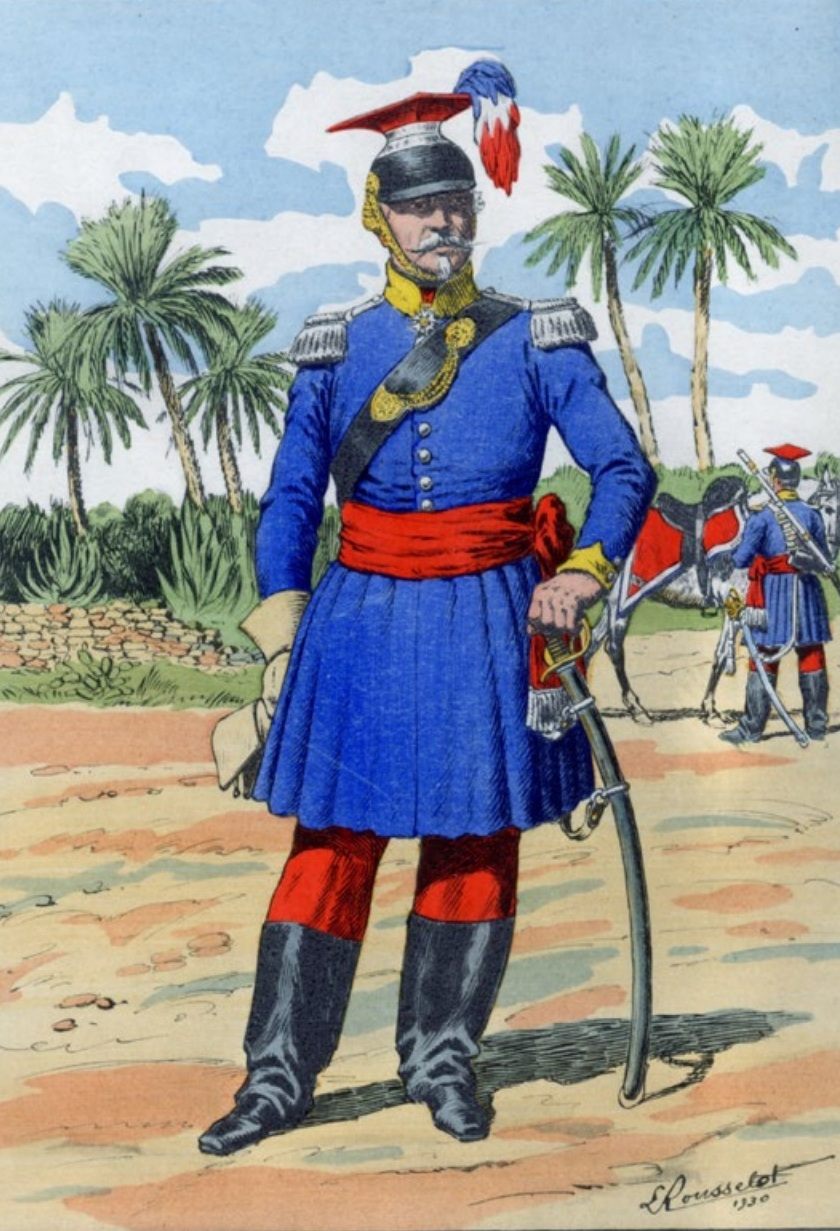
Maximilien Joseph Schauenburg

The ceasefire situation which presided between the Kabylia and the French colonial power in Algiers after the invasion of the troupes coloniales in 1830 suddenly changed when the Kabyle marabouts of the Rahmaniyya Sufi brotherhood rallied to Emir Abdelkader in early 1837.

This is how the Emirate of Abdelkader spread to the eastern suburbs of the Casbah of Algiers and the appointment of Emir Mustapha, younger brother of Emir Abdelkader, as Bey of Titteri encouraged Algerians to plan to attack the new French colonies which extended in Mitidja after the successive massacres which occurred after the massacre of El Ouffia in 1832 and accelerated the spoliation and the sequestration of the lands and properties of the Algerians.

The Kabyle response was not long in coming when the massacre in the Réghaïa region allowed the French to appropriate thousands of hectares of arable land which they distributed on agricultural concessionaires for the establishment of pilot farms, like the two settlers Mercier and Saussine who benefited from 3000 hectares of land for the creation of their farm.

The Emir Mustapha called on the Kabyle marabouts to attack this large farm by carrying out a raid on Reghaïa on 8 May 1837 and to sack the colonial establishment after its plunder.

A disconcerting panic fell on the governor of Algiers, General Damrémont, who decided to punish the Kabyles who contracted a "sacrosanct alliance" with Emir Abdelkader, and he hastened to order the General Perrégaux and Colonel Schauenburg to organize a punitive expedition against the Kabyles of the Khachna Massif, from the Issers valley to the Dellys region.

The military column which was going to chastise the Kabyles began its journey in the evening of 17 May 1837 from the Boudouaou valley towards the Col des Beni Aïcha, but bad weather thwarted this revengeful company, and the few scuffles between the Algerians and the French quickly stopped this first game by summoning the colonial infantry and cavalry to fall back on the bank of Oued Boudouaou on 19 May.

== Battle of the Issers ==
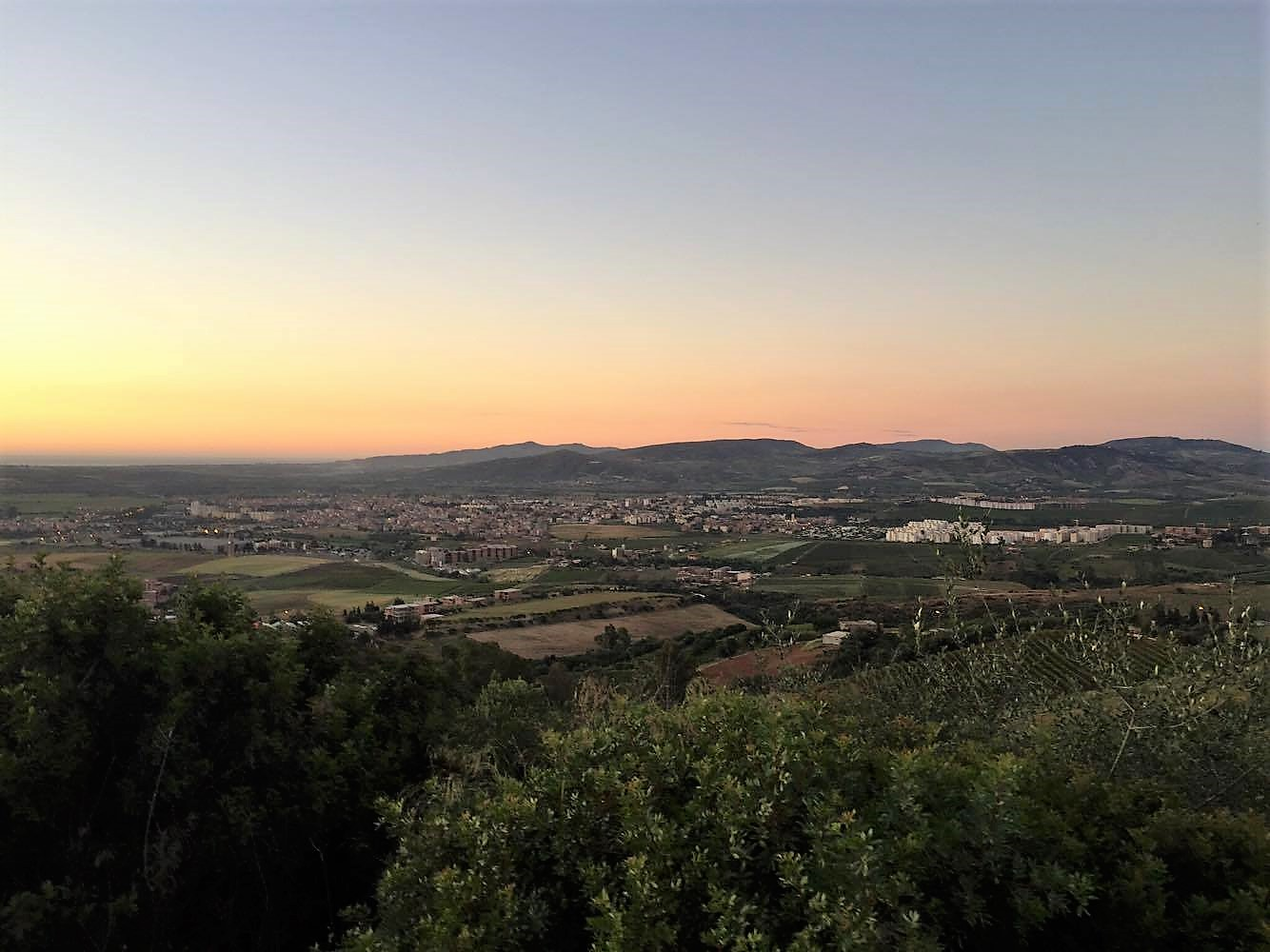
Dreuh Mountain in Ouled Aïssa

After the First Battle of Boudouaou turned in favor of the French because of the advantage of artillery, General Damrémont decided to organize from Algiers a massive offensive dated 26 May 1837 against the Kabyle tribes of Beni Aïcha, Issers, Amraoua and Flissa who had challenged the French colonial power.

The battalion of the French Foreign Legion then detached four of its companies which were sent to reinforce the military column of General Perrégaux who was going to move towards the plain beyond the course of the Oued Isser to punish the villagers who had landed in the Mitidja to carry out raids in the villages (douars) subservient to the French.

The march of the French column began on the evening of 27 May from the Boudouaou encampment to the coastal town of Dellys which was previously impregnable because of the long ceasefire that had been maintained with the Kabyles since the fall of Algiers in 1830.

While General Perrégaux took the old Ottoman paved path which leads from Boudouaou to the Col des Beni Aïcha via the valley of Oued Meraldene, Colonel Schauenburg meanwhile took a coastal path by the coast of Boudouaou El Bahri to Zemmouri El Bahri, so that the two contingents meet in the Legata region in front of the mouth of Oued Isser to attack rebellious villagers from all sides.

When they met near Legata on 28 May, the soldiers of the two contingents crossed the bed of the river to mark their massive presence in the Issers valley, which had until then been a forbidden zone for colonial troops.

The assaulting forces of General Perregaux then headed for the Dreuh mountain (Arabic: جبل الدروع) where the warriors of Beni Aïcha and Issers had taken refuge with the tribe of Ouled Aïssa whose strategic villages overlooked the plain of Oued Issers, the plain of Oued Sebaou and the Mediterranean Sea coast.

Cheikh Ben Zamoum, with Sheikh Boushaki and Sheikh Cherifi, had concentrated their defense on this cliff perched at an altitude of more than 400 meters that the French assailants had to climb and take control with vigor after a tough fight looming.

== Talks of peace ==
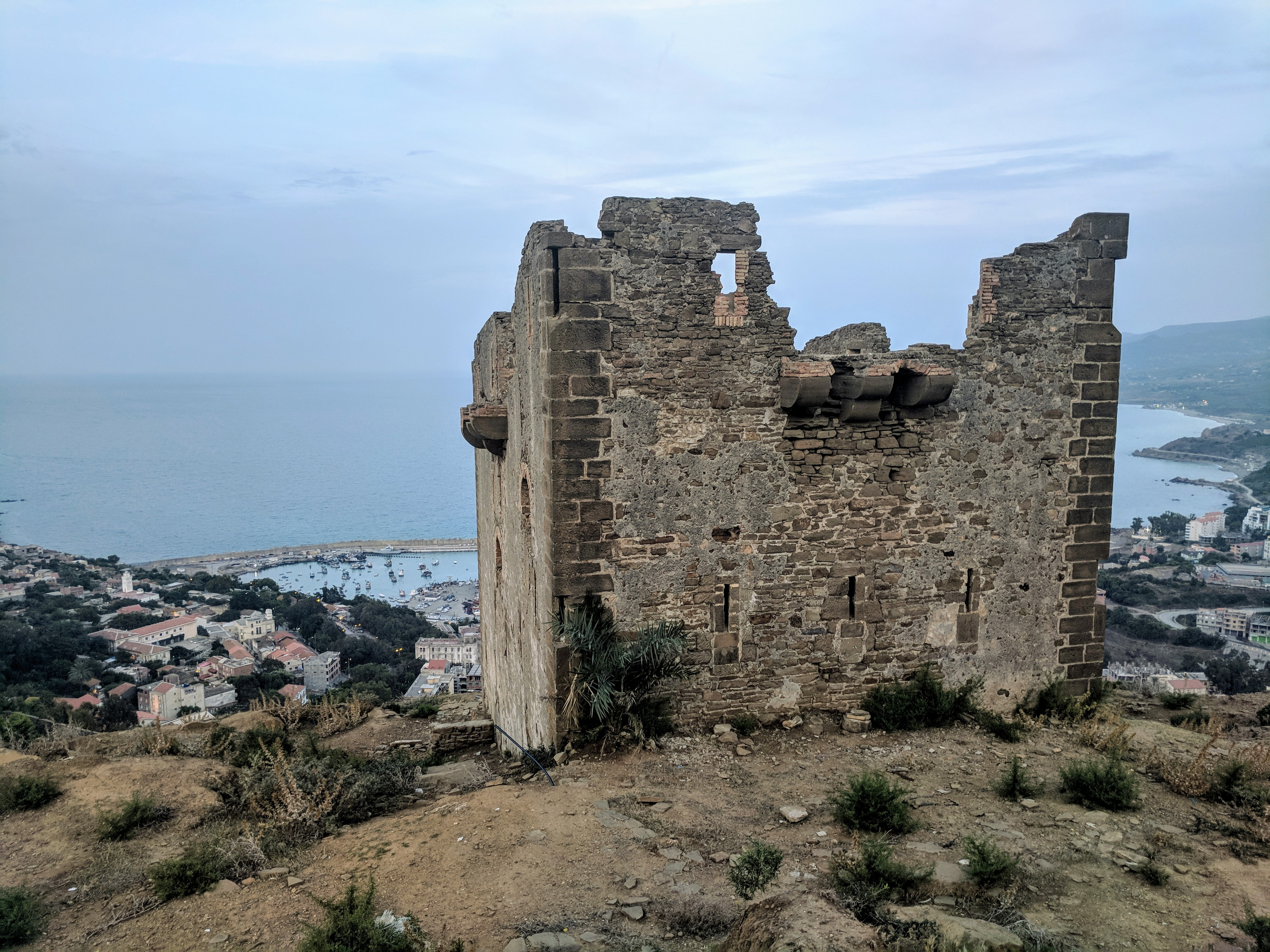
Qubba of "Sidi Soussan" overlooking Dellys.

In the morning of 29 May 1837, a deputation of important sheikhs and marabouts from the Zawiyet Sidi Amar Cherif came to General Perregaux to implore him for the clemency of the victor and to ask to be spared in order to preserve the lives of the villagers and the Kabyle warriors captured in this ultimate showdown.

It is thus that this first Kabyle insurrection of 1837 was crushed and that Sheikh Ben Zamoum was able to escape in time with his close collaborators to the heights of the Djurdjura massif.

This Kabyle defeat east of Mitidja had opened before General Damrémont the ambition and the hope of controlling the other insurrectional strongholds in the south-west of Algiers.

== Assault of Dellys ==
After the armistice of the Kabyles of Beni Aïcha and Issers, a French steamboat and a barge commanded by Félix-Ariel d'Assigny (1794-1846) arrived in front of the small town of Dellys, near the stronghold of the Amraoua tribe, and docked in its port where its notables were are eager without feats of arms and without bloodshed to make all the submissions that the French demanded of them.

The governor of Dellys named El Mouloud Ben Hadj Allal, the cadi Si Ahmed El Mufti and several notables of the city were taken as hostages to Algiers as a form of submission and signs of allegiance and obedience.

== Bibliography ==
- L'Ami de la religion, Volume 93. Paris: Librairie Ecclésiastique d'Adrien le Clere et Cie. 1837. p. 458.
- Léon Blondel (1838). Nouvel aperçu sur l'Algérie: Trois nécessités en Afrique: conserver, pacifier, coloniser. Paris: Delaunay, Éditeur. pp. 64–65.
- Georg H. Schuster (1842). Correspondance militaire, ou recueil de modèles, pièces et actes authentiques relatifs au service militaire. Vienna: Rohrmann, Libraire. pp. 132–133.
- Léon Galibert (1844). L'Algérie ancienne et moderne. Paris: Furne et Cie, Libraires-Éditeurs. pp. 625–626.
- Léon Galibert (1846). L'Algérie ancienne et moderne. Paris: Furne et Cie, Libraires-Éditeurs. p. 602.
- Edmond Pellissier de Reynaud (1854). Annales algériennes, Volume 2. Paris: Librairie Militaire. pp. 177–180.
- Hippolyte Dumas de Lamarche (1855). Les Turcs et les Russes : histoire de la guerre d'Orient. Paris: Gustave Barba, Libraire-Éditeur. p. 26.
- Achille Fillias (1860). Histoire de la conquête et de la colonisation de l'Algérie (1830-1860). Paris: Arnauld de Vresse, Libraire-Éditeur. p. 212.
- Académie des Sciences Morales et Politiques (1865). Séances et Travaux de l'Académie des Sciences Morales et Politiques, Volume 72. Paris: Auguste Durand, Libraire. p. 115.
- Ferdinand-Philippe d'Orléans (1870). Campagnes de l'armée d'Afrique, 1835-1839. Paris: Michel Lévy Frères. p. 281.
- Léon Plée (1874). Abd-El-Kader, nos soldats, nos généraux et la guerre d'Afrique. Paris: Gustave Barba, Libraire-Éditeur. p. 26.
- Société Historique Algérienne (1875). Revue africaine, Numéros 109 à 120. Algiers: Adolphe Jourdan, Libraire-Éditeur. p. 207.
- Société Historique Algérienne (1876). Revue africaine, Volume 20. Algiers: Adolphe Jourdan, Libraire-Éditeur. p. 207.
- Henri d'Ideville (1882). Le maréchal Bugeaud: d'après sa correspondance intime et des documents inédits, Volume 2. Paris: Firmin Didotet Cie, Libraire. p. 60.
- Alphonse Michel Blanc (1885). Généraux et soldats d'Afrique. Paris: Librairie Plon. pp. 117–120.
- Jules Molard (1887). Historique du 63e Régiment d'infanterie (1672 - 1887). Paris: Berger-Levrault et Cie, Libraires-Éditeurs. p. 165.
- Camille Rousset (1887). Les commencements d'une conquète: l'Algérie de 1830 à 1840, Volume 2. Paris: Librairie Plon. p. 220.
- Revue des deux mondes, Volume 80. Paris: Bureau de la Revue des deux mondes. 1887. p. 95.
- Ferdinand-Désiré Quesnoy (1888). L'armée d'Afrique depuis la conquête d'Alger. Paris: Jouvet et Cie, Éditeurs. pp. 117–118.
- Paul Adolphe Grisot, Ernest Auguste Ferdinand Coulombon (1888). La Légion étrangère de 1831 à 1887. Paris: Librairie Militaire, Berger-Levrault et Cie. p. 49.
- Narcisse Faucon (1890). Le livre d'or de l'Algérie: histoire politique, militaire, administrative. Paris: Augustin Challamel, Éditeur. pp. 540–542.
- Gaston Cangloff (1893). Les zouaves: le corps des zouaves, le régiment des zouaves, 1830-1852, Volume 1. Rambervillers: Valentin Risser, Éditeur. p. 107.
- Germain Bapst (1899). Le Maréchal Canrobert: souvenirs d' un siècle, Volume 1. Paris: Librairie Plon. p. 402.
