= Marquis de Faudoas =

French officer

- Born: Paul-Eugène Marquis de Faudoas-Barbazan; 18 May 1788; Santo Domingo
- Died: 13 September 1844 (aged 56); Bordeaux, Kingdom of France
- Spouse: Julia-Maria Bowen
- Children: Marie-Julie-Eugénie de Faudoas; Marguerite de Faudoas
- Military career
- Allegiance: First French Empire (1811–1815); Kingdom of France (1823–1844)
- Branch: French Army
- Service years: 1811–1844
- Rank: Lieutenant general
- Conflicts: Hundred Days French conquest of Algeria: Massacre of El Ouffia (1832)
- Awards: Legion of Honour

Paul-Eugène Marquis de Faudoas-Barbazan (18 May 1788 – 13 September 1844) was a French officer who participated in the French conquest of Algeria.

== Family ==
The Marquis de Faudoas married on 24 September 1833 with Julia-Maria Bowen.

This couple then gave birth to two daughters named successively Marie-Julie-Eugénie de Faudoas and Marguerite de Faudoas.

== Training ==
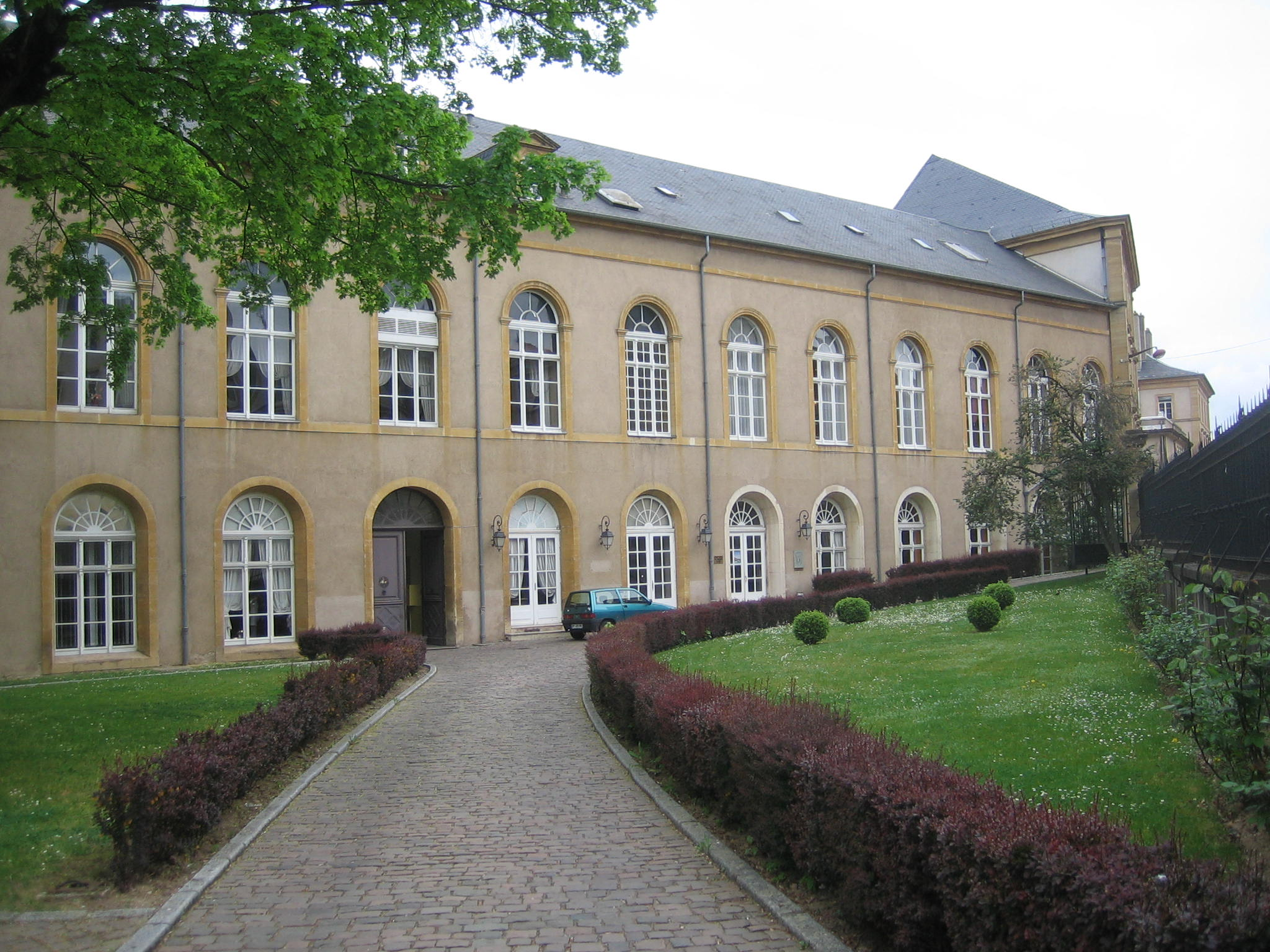
École d'application de l'artillerie et du génie

The Marquis de Faudoas received his military training as an officer cadet in the École d'application de l'artillerie et du génie in Fontainebleau from 29 September 1803.

== Military career ==
The Marquis de Faudoas began his military career with the post of aide-de-camp and then ordainer of Savary from 1807 to 1811.

Successively, he obtained a promotion to the rank of colonel of the 3rd Lancers Regiment and of the 25th Hunter Regiment during the year 1813.

He actively participated in the command of the 4th regiment of hunters during the Hundred Days period in France during the year 1815.

He began a long period of non-activity from 1815 to 1823, before being recalled again to the French Army in the rank of Colonel of the 3rd regiment of hunters on 30 July 1823.

He was promoted to the rank of Maréchal de camp on 22 February 1829.

== French conquest of Algeria ==
The Marquis was recalled to Algeria in the year 1832 to work for the pacification of Mitidja against the permanent insurrection of the Algerians against the French military occupation.

On 6 April 1832, he commanded with the Colonel Maximilien Joseph Schauenburg an expedition of horsemen to the bank of Oued El Harrach east of the Casbah of Algiers, which ended in the Massacre of El Ouffia the next day.

He organized a battle in Boufarik on 2 October 1837 which ended in the defeat of the Algerians and the loss of 500 rebels.

== Return to France ==
Back in France, he was awarded the rank of Lieutenant general on 24 August 1838, and he took command of the 11th Military Division on 27 October 1841.

== Death ==
The Marquis de Faudoas died in Bordeaux on 13 September 1844 at the age of 56 and was buried in a cemetery in the city.

== See also ==
- Hundred Days (1815)
- French Government of the Hundred Days (1815)
- French conquest of Algeria (1830)
- Massacre of El Ouffia (1832)
