= Charles-Marie Denys de Damrémont =

French Army officer and colonial administrator

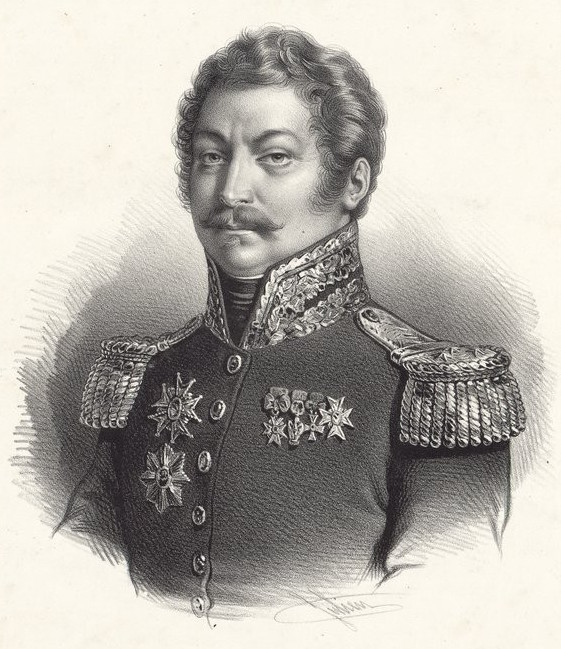
- Engraving of Damrémont
- Born: Charles-Marie Denys de Damrémont; 8 February 1783; Chaumont, France
- Died: 12 October 1837 (aged 54); Constantine, Beylik of Constantine
- Spouse: Clémentine Baraguey d'Hilliers (1800–1892)
- Children: Auguste-Louis-Charles de Damrémont (1819–1884); Henriette-Françoise-Clémentine de Damrémont (1824–1898)
- Military career
- Allegiance: First French Empire; Kingdom of France
- Branch: French Imperial Army; French Royal Army; French Army
- Service years: 1804–1837
- Rank: Lieutenant general
- Conflicts: Napoleonic Wars; Peninsular War; German campaign of 1813; Campaign in north-east France (1814); French conquest of Algeria; Raid on Reghaïa (1837); Expedition of the Col des Beni Aïcha; First Battle of Boudouaou; First Assault of Dellys; Siege of Constantine †
- Awards: Legion of Honour

Lieutenant-General Charles-Marie Denys, comte de Damrémont (8 February 1783 – 12 October 1837) was a French Army officer and colonial administrator. He was killed in combat during the siege of Constantine.

== Early life ==
Charles-Marie Denys was born in Chaumont, Haute-Marne on 8 February 1783.

His father was Antoine Denys de Damrémont (1730-1807) who belonged to a family of merchants from Bologna and who got rich in forges in the 17th century.

== Military training ==
He entered the military school at Fontainebleau in 1803.

After graduating from the school on 1804 he became a lieutenant in the 12th regiment of chasseurs à cheval.

== Campaigns of Napoleon ==
He took part in the Wars of the Third and Fourth Coalitions. In 1807 he became aide-de-camp to General Defrance and afterwards to Marshal Marmont.

In 1811 and 1812 Damrémont served in the Peninsular War but in 1813 he transferred to the Grande Armée with which he fought in the German campaign of 1813 and the campaign in north-east France in 1814.

During the Hundred Days Damrémont became a colonel.

On 25 April 1821 Damrémont was promoted to Maréchal de camp.

In 1823 he was given command of a unit in the 5th Corps in the Army of the Pyrenees, which took part in the French invasion of Spain.

From 1823 to 1829 he served as inspector of the infantry and was named as a member of various military commissions.

== Conquest of Algeria ==
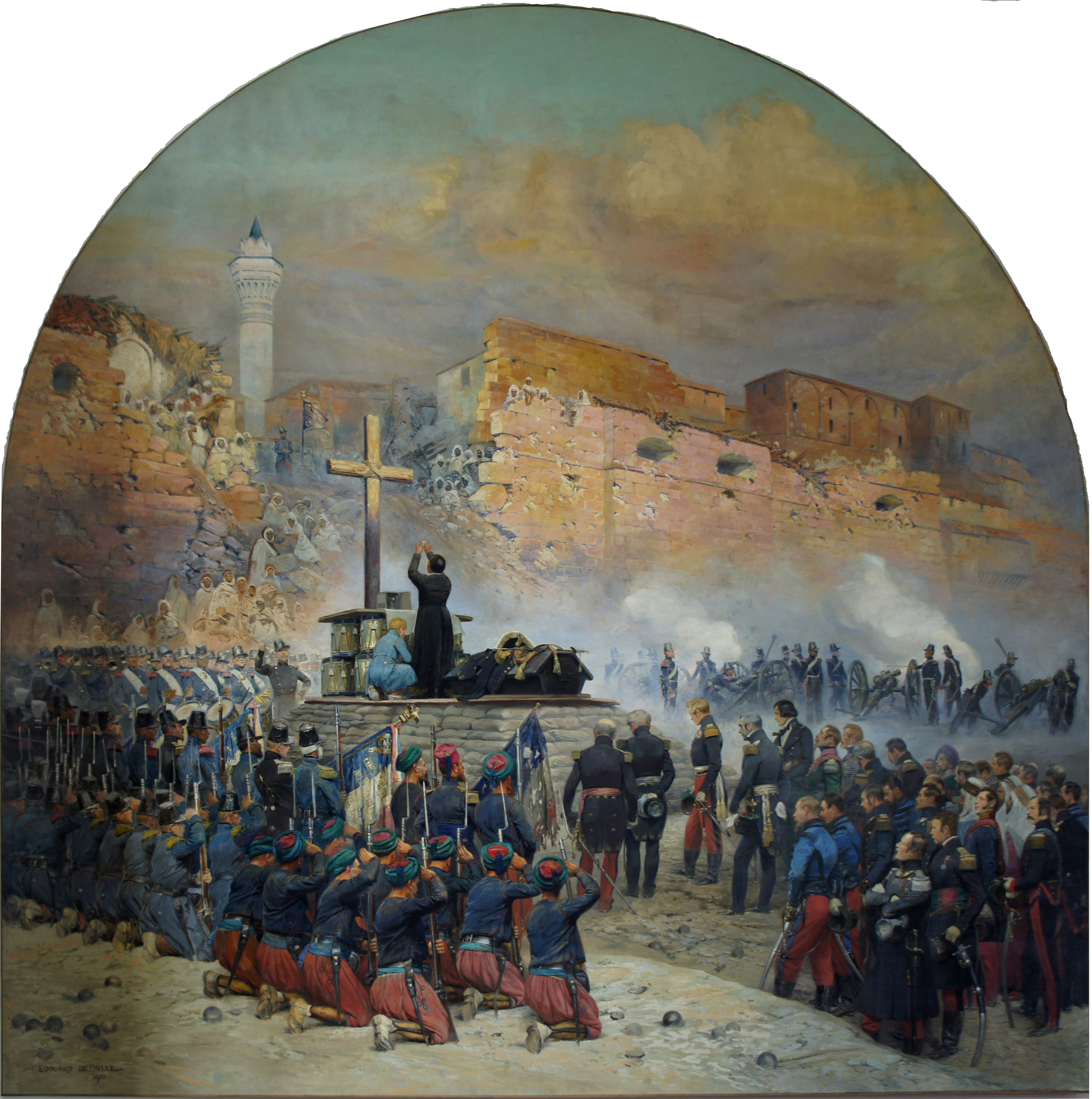
Damrémont's funeral (1837)

In 1830 he commanded an infantry brigade in the French invasion of Algeria. On 13 December 1830 Damrémont was promoted to lieutenant-general.

== Back to France ==
After his participation with the troupes coloniales at the start of the French conquest of Algeria, Damrémont returned to France where he was given command of the 8th military division in Marseille on 6 February 1832.

On 15 September 1835 he was named Pair de France.

== Governor of Algeria ==
On 12 February 1837 Damrémont was appointed governor-general of French Algeria.

He was appointed to this strategic post after General Bertrand Clauzel (1772–1842) failed in 1836 during the First Battle of Constantine.

Governor Damrémont had in his new mission to gather reinforcements and adequate resources in order to succeed in the conquest of the Constantinois region. The major opponents to French control In Algeria were Ahmed Bey (1786-1851) in the Constantinois, with the Emir Abdelkader (1808–1883) in Orania. Of these the War Ministry prioritised Ahmed Bey as to restore French honour following the defeat of Clauzel.

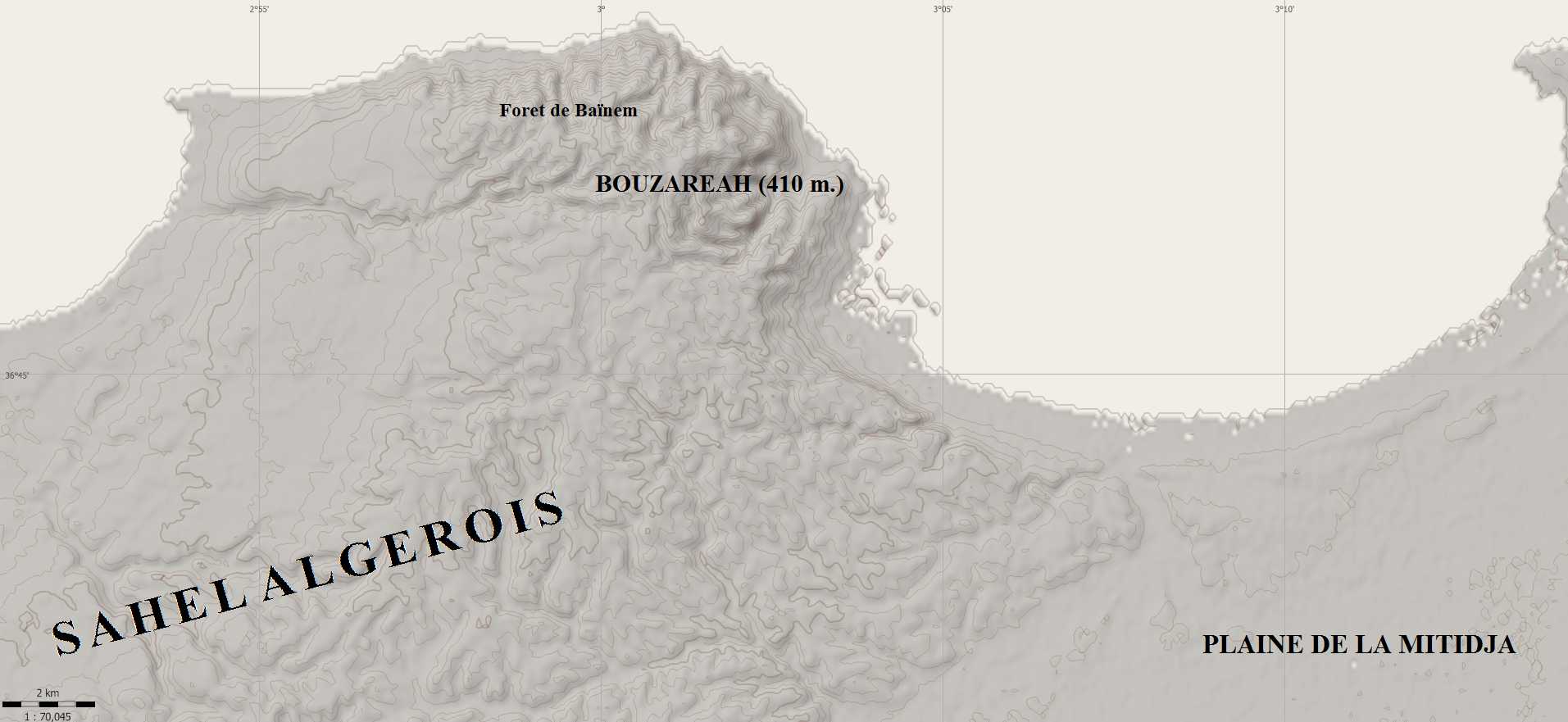
Algerian Sahel

=== Setting conditions for the siege of Constantine ===
==== Mitidja ====
General Damrémont spent the first half of 1837 in partial engagements with rebels affiliated with Emir Mustapha (1814–1863) in the Algerian Sahel and Mitidja.

Indeed, the Emir Mustapha organized from his stronghold of Médéa in the Titteri massif, guerrilla attacks against the French camps in Mitidja .

This conflicting situation at the gates of the Casbah of Algiers caused worry and hassle in Damrémont which could not quickly organize decisive expeditions and military campaigns outside the Mitidja.

But the Khachna and Djurdjura mountains were formidable barriers to the passage of his army and the terrain enabled the Kabyle tribes and the marabouts of the zawiyas belonging to the Rahmaniyya Sufi brotherhood to resist a future attack on Constantine.

On 8 May 1837, the attack on Reghaïa in Mitidja occurred, against a colonial farm of 3000 hectares in area by the Kabyles of Beni Aïcha, Issers and Amraoua. General Damrémont responded to the disarray which settled in Algiers among the French, the day after the raid on Reghaïa, to organize a punitive expedition to pacify the eastern region of Mitidja which borders the Kabylia of rebels subservient to the Emir Mustapha and the marabouts.

==== Kabylia ====
Governor Damrémont decided in the aftermath of the Mitidja troubles to task General Alexandre Charles Perrégaux with a mission to subdue the coastal town of Dellys from where the Amraoua Kabyles had used as a base to devastate the French agricultural concession in the Mitidja.

Instructions were given to General Perrégaux to divide the troupes coloniales involved in this punitive expedition against the Kabyles into two distinct military columns.

The first maritime column was to be commanded by Perregaux himself, and was going to embark on 17 May 1837 on ships from the port of Algiers in order to land on the shore of Oued Isser then move forward to disembark in the port of Dellys.

The second column of infantry and cavalry, which was to be commanded by Colonel Maximilien Joseph Schauenburg (1784-1838), would also begin a sustained march on 17 May 1837 from Boudouaou to reach the Col des Beni Aïcha to meet the naval forces disembarked from Perrégaux in the Issers valley in order to continue the expedition to the Amraoua dens around the Casbah of Dellys.

==== Peace with Abdelkader ====
Damrémont took advantage of the presence of General Bugeaud (1784–1849) in Algeria to send him to Orania to attack the capital of the Emirate of Abdelkader in order to open up the region of Algérois with the strategic goal of bringing about stability in western Algeria so that Damrémont could devote himself to preparing the ultimate expedition against Constantine. Bugeaud was successful and would win a victory against the Emir at the Sikkak river, in turn leading to the Treaty of Tafna. Damrémont allowed by the peace with Emir Abdelkader's state to concentrate greater force to the east to his objective

=== Constantinois ===
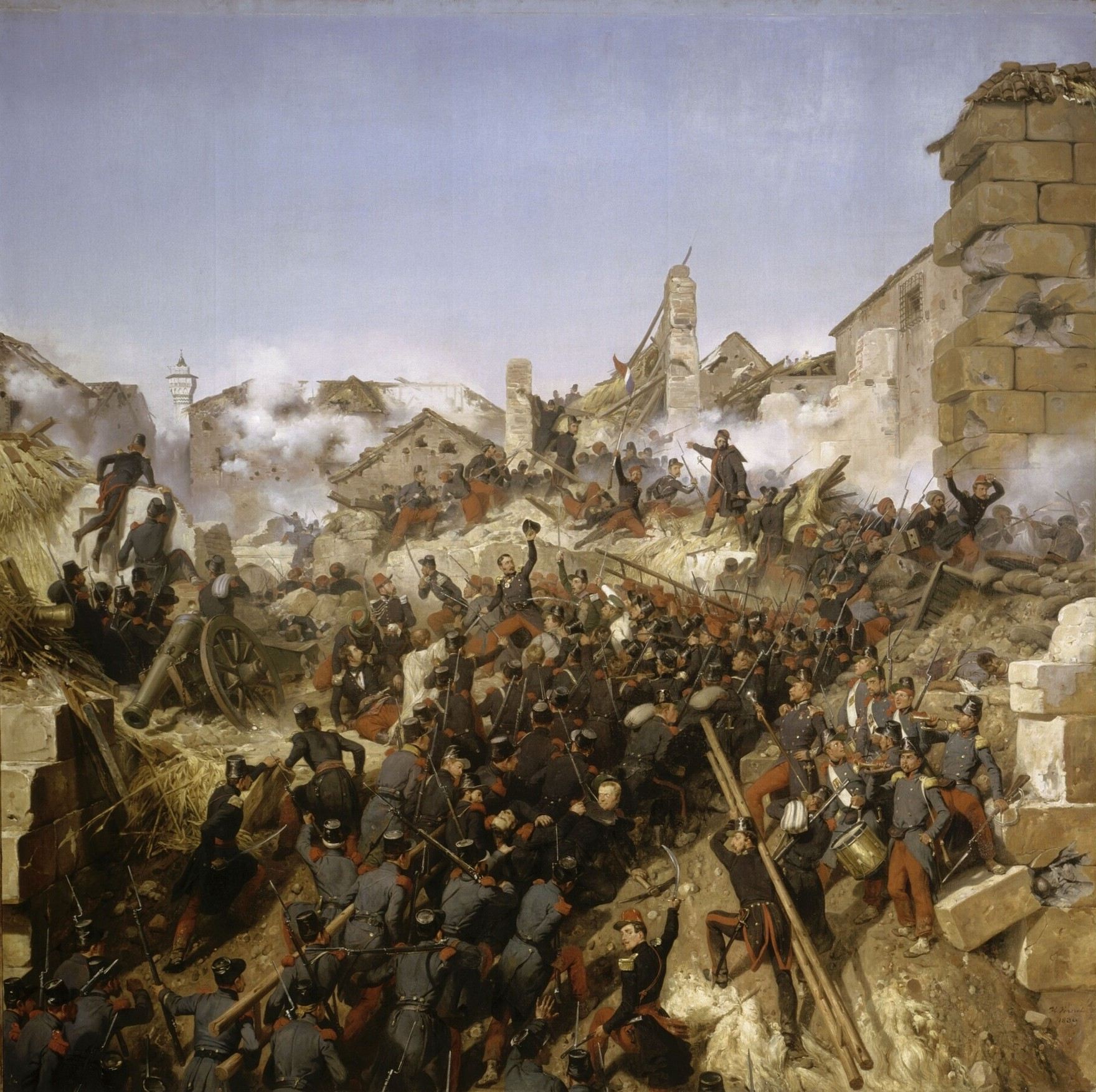
The Siege of Constantine (painting) by Horace Vernet (1838)

In October 1837 Damrémont commanded an expedition against Constantine. During the siege Damrémont was hit in the head by a bullet and mortally wounded during the evening of 12 October. He was replaced by general Valée who continued the attack and proceeded to capture the city on the 13th.

== Burial ==
Damrémont was buried in a ceremony at Les Invalides, which also saw the premiere of Hector Berlioz's Requiem.

== Awards ==
Charles-Marie Denys de Damrémont was decorated with several medals during his military career, including:

- Officer of the Legion of Honour, decorated with this medal since 15 September 1827.

== Family ==
Damrémont married Clémentine Baraguey d'Hilliers (25 October 1800–4 February 1892), the daughter of General Louis Baraguey d'Hilliers, on 7 February 1819. The couple had two children:

- Auguste-Louis-Charles, born 11 December 1819 in Paris and died in 1884.
- Henriette-Françoise-Clémentine, born 11 March 1824 also in Paris and died in 1898.

== See also ==
- French conquest of Algeria
- Bertrand Clauzel
- Emirate of Abdelkader
- Emir Abdelkader
- Emir Mustapha
- Ahmed Bey ben Mohamed Chérif
- First Raid on Reghaïa (1837)
- Expedition of the Col des Beni Aïcha (1837)
- First Battle of Boudouaou (1837)
- First Battle of the Issers (1837)
- Siege of Constantine (1837)
- Alexandre Charles Perrégaux
- Maximilien Joseph Schauenburg
- Antoine de La Torré
- Mitidja
- Khachna
- Kabylia
- List of works by James Pradier

== Sources ==
- Mullié, Charles (1852). "Damrémont" . Biographie des célébrités militaires des armées de terre et de mer de 1789 à 1850 (in French). Paris: Poignavant et Compagnie.
