= Emir Mustapha =

19th century Algerian religious and military leader

Emir Mustapha El Djezaïri مصطفى الـجـزائـري
- مصطفى ابن محيي الدين
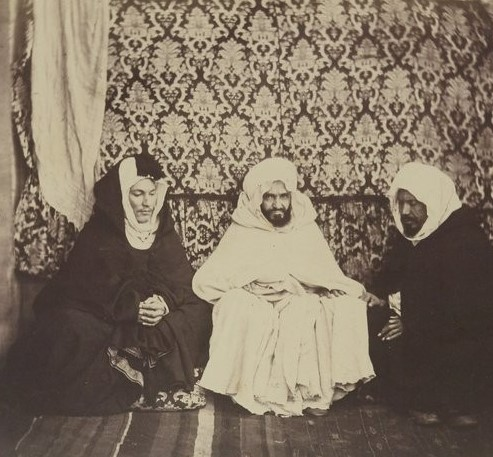
- Picture of Mustapha (center) and his two brothers Hussein (left) and Mohammed-Said (right)
- Born: Mustafa ibn Muhieddine al-Hasani; 1814; Guetna, Regency of Algiers
- Died: 1863 (aged 48–49); Morocco
- Military career
- Allegiance: Emirate of Abdelkader
- Rank: Emir, Caliph, Bey
- Conflicts: Raid on Reghaïa (1837); Expedition of the Col des Beni Aïcha (1837); First Battle of Boudouaou (1837)

Mustapha ibn Muhieddine (1814–1863; Arabic: مصطفى ابن محيي الدين Mustafa ibn Muḥy al-dīn), known as Emir Mustapha, Sidi Moustafa, Moustafa El Hassani El Djazairi, was an Algerian religious and military leader who led a struggle against the French colonial invasion in the mid-19th century with his brother, Emir Abdelkader.

== Family ==
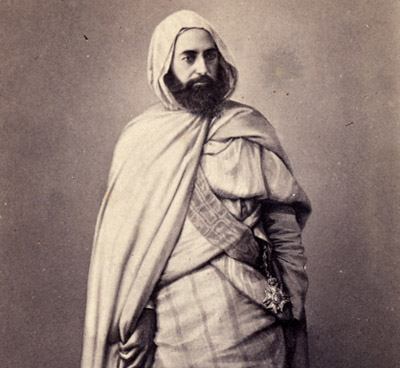
Emir Abdelkader

Mustapha was one of Mahieddine's sons and the younger brother of Emir Abdelkader. He married one of his cousins, with whom he had three sons and two daughters.

In memory of his father, one of his sons was named Mahieddine, who married his cousin Zeyneb, the daughter of his uncle Emir Abdelkader.

== French conquest ==
Mustapha strove to gain influence in the Emirate of Abdelkader and took an important part in the affairs of the Algerian country.

== Sahara tribes ==
In 1836, Mustapha tried proclaim himself Sheikh of the Algerian Sahara tribe who had rallied to Abdelkader, but his attempt failed and he was struck with disgrace. However, he deeply apologised, so Abdelkader appointed him bey of Titteri in Médéa.

== Khalifa of Médéa ==
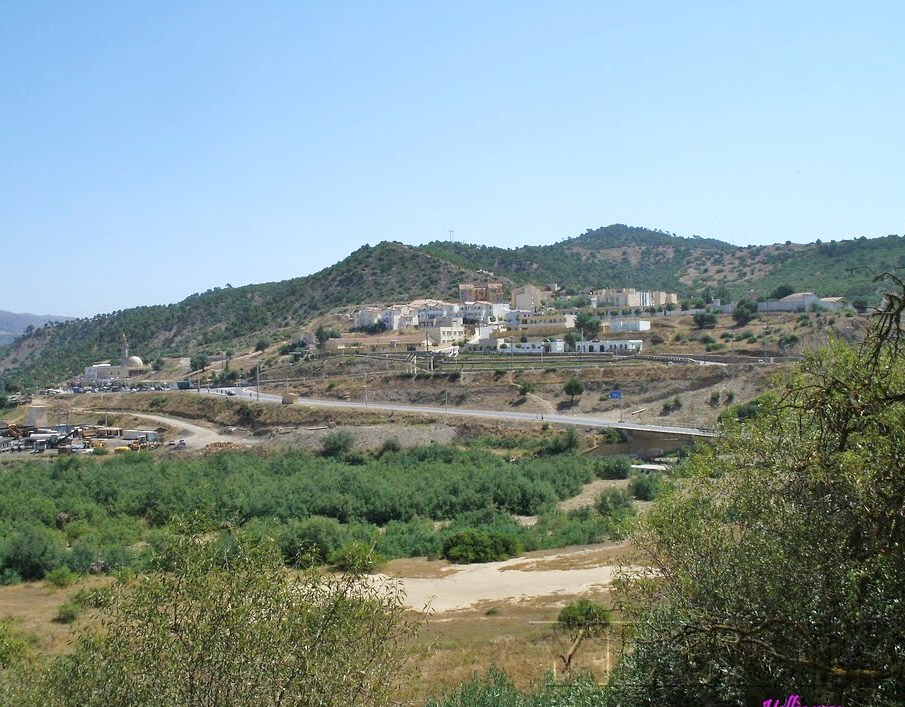
Landscape of the Mezghena commune in the Titteri.

When Abdelkader laid siege to the city of Tlemcen in July 1836 to liberate it from General Louis-Eugène Cavaignac, he received news that some people had tried to rally the French and to rebel against him in Médéa.

Abdelkader let an auxiliary force continue the siege of the French garrison in Tlemcen, and advanced with dozens of cavaliers to Médéa to stop the rebellion.

Abdelkader wanted give land to his younger brother Mustafa, and in turn named him khalifa of Médéa territory before returning to Tlemcen to continue the siege.

Mustapha worked to submit Titteri and Mitidja to the power of the Emirate of Abdelkader before passing the title of Bey of Titteri to his successor, Mohamed Berkani.

== Revolt of Kabylia ==
On May 8, 1837, Mustapha organized a surprise attack on a large agricultural farm in Reghaïa to force the French occupiers to sign a cease-fire treaty with Abdelkader.

The farm, managed by settlers Mercier and Saussine, was positioned with its 3,000 hectares of area at the entrance of Kabylia which remained in sight of the sustained advance of French colonization towards the plains of Oued Isser.

Mustapha urged the marabouts of the zawiyas of the Beni Aïcha, the Issers, and the Amraoua to terrorize the French settlers to stop the invasion of the mountain range of Khachna, which precedes Djurdjura.

The first Kabyle attack on Reghaïa alarmed General Charles-Marie Denys de Damrémont, who was the military governor of Algiers. He ordered General Alexandre Charles Perrégaux and Colonel Maximilien Joseph Schauenburg to organize a punitive expedition against the Kabyles who sacked and looted the farm.

Mustapha's goal was achieved, since the colonial troops, who were to quickly join Orania in order to contribute with General Bugeaud to the defeat of Abdelkader, were maintained and posted in Algiers in order to protect it and to organize the counter-offensive against the Emirate of Abdelkader.

During the expedition of the Col des Beni Aïcha on May 17, 1837, the colonial forces lost because of bad weather, while the First Battle of Boudouaou on May 25 ended with the signing of the Treaty of Tafna on May 30.

== Khalifa of M'Sila ==
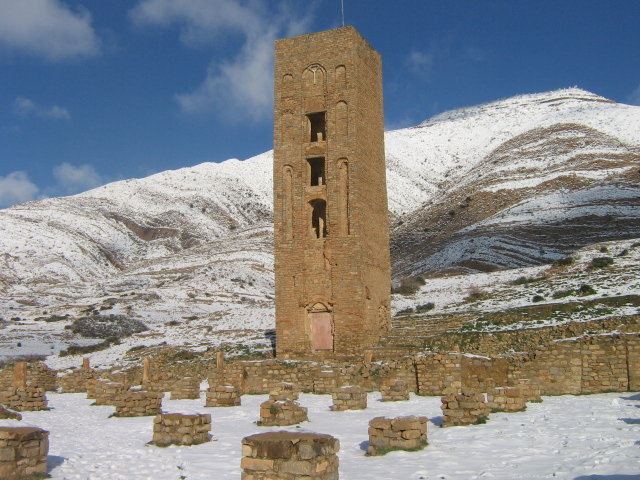
Hodna Mountains

Mustapha was later appointed in August 1839 by Abdelkader as Khalifa of the Hodna region around the M'Sila territory. As soon as he arrived in M'Sila, he headed for the Hautes Plaines in the northeast, calling all the tribes in his path to arms against the French, and in less than eight days, the insurrection became widespread.

== Constantinois ==
At the beginning of 1840, Mustapha was commander-in-chief to the Algerian rebels that Abdelkader sent to the province of Constantine to harass the French troops.

Mustapha carried out his mission in the Constantinois region and returned to temporarily live in Medjana before returning to the traveling capital of Abdelkader.

== Château d'Amboise ==
After Abdelkader surrendered in 1847, Mustapha accompanied him with the other members of his family to be exiled in the Château d'Amboise in France. Mustapha, along with all of his other brothers, left Amboise and settled in Morocco.

== See also ==
- French conquest of Algeria
- Emirate of Abdelkader
- First Raid on Reghaïa (8 May 1837)
- Expedition of the Col des Beni Aïcha (17 May 1837)
- First Battle of Boudouaou (25 May 1837)
- First Battle of the Issers (27 May 1837)
- Treaty of Tafna (30 May 1837)

== Bibliography ==
- Armand-Gabriel Rozey (1840). Cris de conscience de l'Algérie. Paris: Rousseau, Libraire. pp. 336–343.
- George Henri Schuster (1842). Correspondance militaire, ou recueil de modèles, pièces et actes authentiques relatifs au service militaire. Vienna: P. Rohrmann, Libraire. pp. 132–133.
- Léon Galibert (1843). Histoire de l'Algérie, ancienne et moderne. Paris: Furne et Cie, Libraires-Éditeurs. pp. 474–475.
- Léon Galibert (1844). L'Algérie ancienne et moderne. Paris: Furne et Cie, Libraires-Éditeurs. pp. 625–626.
- Ministère de la Guerre (1845). Tableau de la situation des établissements français dans l'Algérie. Paris: Imprimerie royale. p. 405.
- Histoire pittoresque de l'Afrique française. Paris: B. Renault, Éditeur. 1845. p. 219.
- Journal des connaissances utiles: Courrier des familles, Volume 15. Paris. 1846. p. 345.
- Société orientale (1846). Revue de l'Orient: Bulletin de la Société orientale, Volume 9. Paris: Delavigne, Libraire. pp. 344–346.
- Auguste Debay (1848). Biographie d'Abd-el-Kader écrite dans le pays même où est né le célèbre bédouin. Relation de sa défaite et de sa soumission. Paris: Moquet, Libraire-Éditeur. p. 32.
- Clara Filleul de Pétighy (1851). L'Algérie. Clermont: Thibaut-Landriot frères, Éditeurs. pp. 255–256.
- Eugène de Civry (1853). Napoléon III et Abd-el-Kader, Charlemagne et Witikind. Paris: P. Martinon, Libraire-Éditeur. pp. 432–434.
- Moritz Wagner (1854). The Tricolor on the Atlas, or, Algeria and the French Conquest. New York: Thomas Nelson. pp. 288–289.
- Société orientale (1854). Revue de l'Orient et de L'Algérie et des Colonies. Paris: Just Rouvier, Libraire. p. 56.
- Arsène Berteuil (1856). L'Algérie française, Volume 2. Paris: Dentu, Libraire-Éditeur. p. 245.
- Louis-Adrien Berbrugger (1857). Les époques militaires de la Grande Kabilie. Algiers: Bastide, Librairie-Éditeur. pp. 13–15.
- Edouard Carteron (1858). Compleḿent de l'Encycloped́ie moderne - Tome septième. Paris: Firmin Didot et Cie, Imprimeurs-Libraires. p. 376.
- Revue contemporaine, Volume 63. Paris: Bureaux de la revue contemporaine. 1862. p. 530.
- Alexandre Bellemare (1863). Abd-el-Kader, sa vie politique et militaire. Paris: Louis Hachette et Cie, Libraire. p. 166.
- Recueil des notices et mémoires de la Société archélologique de la province de Constantine, Volumes 8 à 9. Constantine: Alessi et Arnolet, Libraire-Éditeur. 1864. pp. 197–198.
- Société historique algérienne (1867). Revue africaine, Volume 11. Algiers: Adolphe Jourdan, Libraire-Éditeur. pp. 370–371.
- Ferdinand-Philippe d'Orléans (1870). Campagnes de l'armée d'Afrique, 1835-1839. Paris: Michel Lévy Frères. pp. 270–274.
- Société historique algérienne (1884). Revue africaine, Volume 28. Algiers: Adolphe Jourdan, Libraire-Éditeur. p. 327.
- Jean Baptiste Xavier Bardon (1886). Histoire nationale de l'Algérie. Paris: Ernest Leroux, Éditeur. p. 237.
- Ferdinand-Désiré Quesnoy (1888). L'armée d'Afrique depuis la conquête d'Alger. Paris: Jouvet et Cie, Éditeurs. pp. 116–117.
- Lucien Darier-Chatelain (1888). Historique du 3e régiment de tirailleurs algériens. Constantine: Georges Heim, Éditeur. pp. 14–16.
- Léonce Grandin (1898). Le général Bourbaki. Paris: Berger-Levrault, Éditeur. p. 34.
- Georges Yver (1927). Correspondance du général Damrémont (1837). Paris: Honoré Champion, Librairie ancienne. pp. 150–164–173.
