= Reghaïa (disambiguation) =

Reghaïa is a town and commune in Algeria.

It may also refer to:

- Raid on Reghaïa (1837), a battle during French conquest of Algeria.
- Reghaïa River, a river in Algeria.
