= First Battle of Boudouaou =

- Part of the French conquest of Algeria
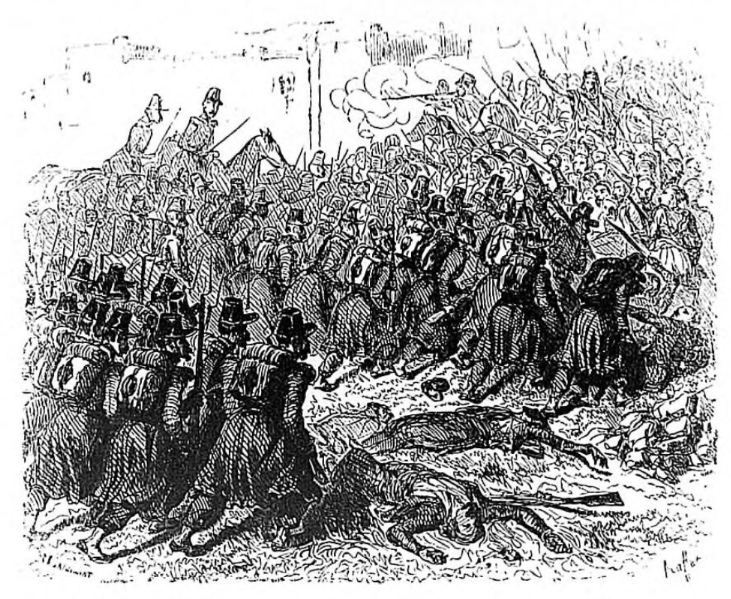
- First battle of Boudouaou in 1837 (engraving by Auguste Raffet, 1839)
| Date | 25–26 May 1837 |
| Location | Boudouaou, Kabylia, Algeria 36.7244001°N 3.4113804°E |

Belligerents
| Emirate of Mascara: (Libya) Islamic Zawiyas; Rahmaniyya | Kingdom of France |

Commanders and leaders
| Emir Abdelkader (Libya) Cheikh Ali Boushaki (Libya) Cheikh Ben Zamoum | (France) Damrémont (France) Schauenburg (France) Perrégaux (France) La Torré (France) Lixières |

Strength
| Kabyles: 5,500 warriors; 500 riders | Troupes coloniales: 950 infantrymen; 45 riders |

Casualties and losses
| 100 warriors killed | 8 soldiers killed; 65 soldiers injured |

The First Battle of Boudouaou in 25–26 May 1837, during the French conquest of Algeria, pitted the troupes coloniales under Colonel Maximilien Joseph Schauenburg against the troops of Kabylia of the Igawawen.

== Background ==
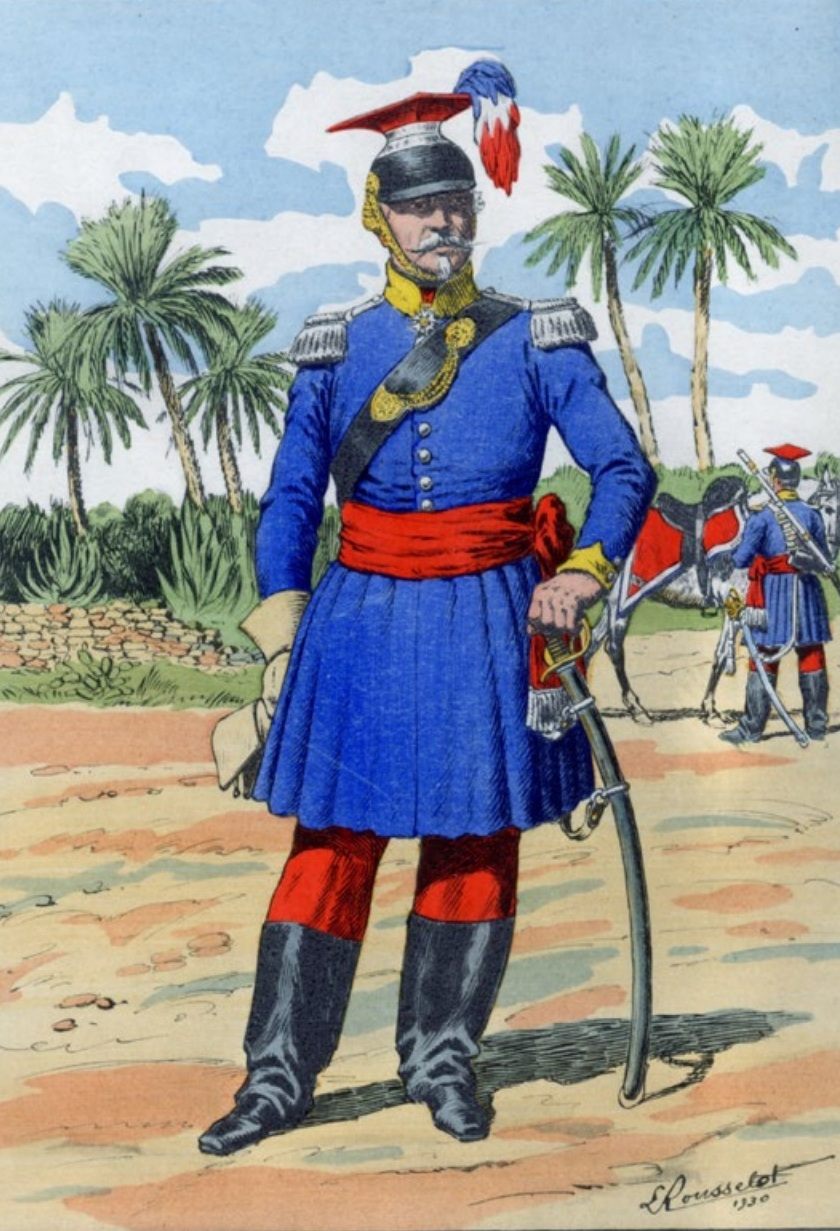
Maximilien Joseph Schauenburg

When Emir Abdelkader was preparing to negotiate a truce with the French invaders in 1837 in order to devote himself to building his Emirate which would then encircle the Casbah of Algiers, he then stepped up his attacks against agricultural farms and French military posts in Mitidja to balance the balance of power to its advantage.

He then set up his command center in Titteri mountain range and, from 8 May 1837, caused an insurrection of the Kabyles of the Khachna mountain range, the Beni Aïcha region and the Issers plain to the east of the rich plain of Mitidja.

This is how the attack on the Mercier farm in Réghaïa by the rebels commanded by Emir Mustapha, brother of Emir Abdelkader, was going to create an already fragile military shift between the French soldiers and the Kabyle rebels who had imposed themselves and content to reign east of the Oued Boudouaou since the fall of power in Algiers during 1830.

This attack was followed by looting and sacking of this agricultural farm overlooking the Kabyle country, and this upheaval at the gates of Algiers forced Governor General Charles-Marie Denys de Damrémont and his lieutenant General Alexandre Charles Perrégaux to undertake a military expedition on 17 May 1837. on the Beni Aïcha and the Issers to counter the allies of Emir Abdelkader and push them back towards the eastern shore of Oued Isser.

The bitter failure that Colonel Maximilien Joseph Schauenburg suffered during the expedition to the Col des Beni Aïcha during the day of 18 May 1837 because of the bad weather which had fallen on his military column in this spring season and because of its ignorance of the marshy and bushy terrain of the Beni Aïcha region around Meraldene River, dealt a terrible blow to the morale of the troupes coloniales engaged in the expedition, but also to the soldiers who had remained stationed in a military camp in the joint ownership of Boudouaou.

The Kabyles of Beni Aïcha under the direction of the marabout Cheikh Ali Boushaki had been reinforced and backed up by the reinforcements arrived from Laazib Zamoum under the direction of Cheikh Ben Zamoum, and who all together thwarted the expedition of Colonel Schauenburg who is then withdrawn in the haste and the rout towards the camp of Boudouaou to spare its troops of a programmed and imminent decimation.

== Boudouaou Camp ==
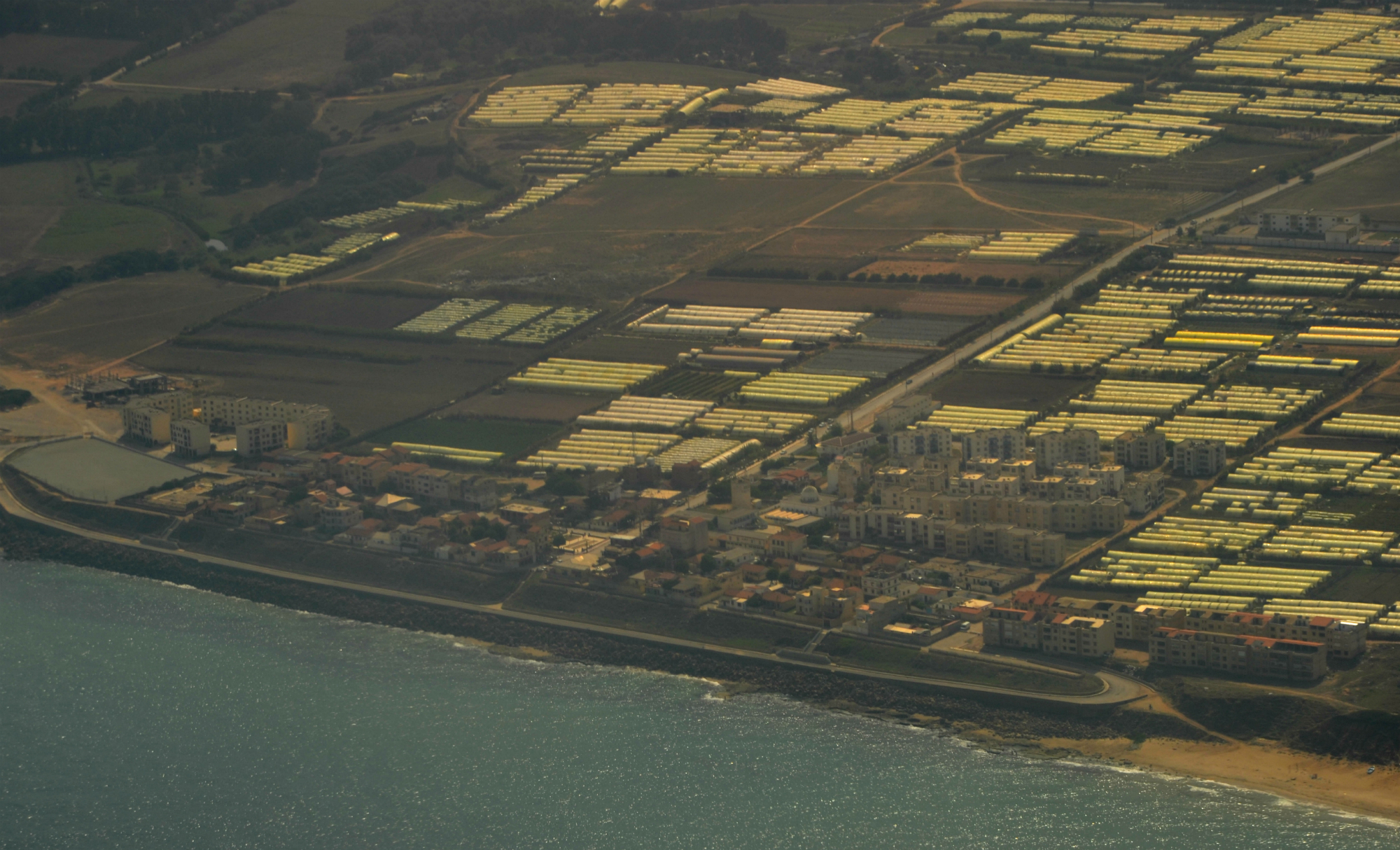
River mouth of Oued Boudouaou

When Colonel Schauenburg brought back from the Col des Beni Aïcha on 19 May 1837 his three thousand soldiers to the Boudouaou camp by a very strong sustained march to flee the Kabyles who were defending their land, they then found a supply convoy there to meet their food needs.

Indeed, the failure of the first expedition to Kabylia was also due to the non-arrival of General Perrégaux who had been prevented from landing on the shore of Zemmouri El Bahri near the mouth of Oued Merdja with his thousand soldiers and provisions of food, and this because of the storm which had hit the Bay of Algiers and which prevented his ship from reaching the shores of Kabylia.

The Boudouaou camp allowed these French soldiers to withdraw safely after having consumed all their food which was only enough for three days of expedition, and this supply convoy found in Boudouaou fell at the peak to fill the bags of the soldiers who had emptied in those cold and harsh days.

Colonel Schauenburg took on his return from the valley of Oued Meraldene to Boudouaou a winding path along the Mediterranean sea near the mouth of Oued Corso in order to guard and protect the rear and flanks of his military troop.

But when the French column was going to dodge the harassment of the rebels which had lasted since the morning, and was going to arrive at a natural fountain to quench their thirst before reaching Boudouaou, the kabyles of Cheikh Ali Boushaki and of Cheikh Ben Zamoum attempted a double attack on Schauenburg's troops.

Indeed, the Amraoua cavalry undertook a lateral attack on the beach of the sea of Boudouaou El Bahri, while the Kabyle infantry of the Beni Aïcha was stationed on the heights to surround and attack the French invaders.

Colonel Schauenburg had guessed this movement of the Kabyles, and he ordered fire shells to be fired from two pieces of mountain, and to launch scuffles of the infantry which was ambushed.

This French response then stopped the Kabyle riders, while an offensive return of the soldiers was carried out trying to outflank the Kabyles, and this gave the column time to cross the parade which preceded the haven of peace of Boudouaou.

The Kabyles temporarily contented themselves with tracking down the French to Boudouaou and did not continue their pursuit to the military camp.

General Damrémont took advantage of this escapade and this withdrawal, hoping that the Kabyle uprising was going to abort, and believed to be able to have military troops to promote an expedition to the West of Algeria to reinforce General Thomas Robert Bugeaud (1784–1849).

But Damrémont did not order to leave the valley of Boudouaou, and he wanted to perpetuate the French presence at the entrance of Kabylia by permanently threatening the Beni Aïcha and the Issers, and this by the establishment of a fortified and entrenched camp at Boudouaou, which is a strategic position equidistant from the various valleys of Sebaou, Issers and Meraldene on the one hand and the Mitidja plain on the other.

== Garrison ==
From 8 May to 25 May 1837, the Emir Abdelkader forced General Damrémont to mobilize a garrison and a body of troops stationed in the Boudouaou camp in a stronghold at the entrance to Kabylia in order to defend Algiers against a possible attack by rebels and Kabyle dissidents.

These hundreds of French soldiers posted and exposed in the Boudouaou ravine were already a sign of success for Emir Abdelkader to have forced the French to build one more isolated military post, with all the embarrassments and all the dangers to the soldiers involved in each new sedentary establishment.

The garrison that was maintained at Boudouaou was made up of only one battalion, which was a latent and indirect victory for the Kabyle who hoped for a more striking and immediate triumph by attacking this reduced number of French soldiers who had been left behind on the spot to raise the redoubt.

== Battle ==
The leaders of the Kabyle coalition, Cheikh Ali Boushaki and Cheikh Ben Zamoum, did not miss such a great opportunity to attack with superior Algerian forces this weak detachment of French soldiers, before their work of building the camp of Boudouaou protected and sheltered them from rebel attacks.

The construction and the shoulder of the camp had still very little to be completed, when at sunrise of 25 May 1837, about 5,500 Kabyles on foot and 500 horsemen on horseback appeared on the east bank of the Oued Boudouaou, in front of the French bivouac.

The French soldiers surprised in the camp by the Kabyle attack were then commanded by the battalion chief the Commandant Antoine de La Torré (1787–1851), of the 2nd light regiment, and they were then only 900 infantrymen, of the 2nd light regiment and 48th line regiment, and 45 riders on horse, of the 1st hunter regiment, with two mountain howitzers supplied with four shots.

== See also ==
- Emir Abdelkader
- Emirate of Abdelkader
- Igawawen
- French conquest of Algeria
- First Raid on Reghaïa (1837)
- Expedition of the Col des Beni Aïcha (1837)
- First Battle of the Issers (1837)
- List of French governors of Algeria
- Charles-Marie Denys de Damrémont
- Maximilien Joseph Schauenburg
- Alexandre Charles Perrégaux
- Antoine de La Torré

== Bibliography ==
- Léon Blondel (1838). Nouvel aperçu sur l'Algérie: Trois nécessités en Afrique: conserver, pacifier, coloniser. Paris: Delaunay, Éditeur. pp. 64–65.
- Léon Galibert (1844). L'Algérie ancienne et moderne. Paris: Furne et Cie, Libraires-Éditeurs. pp. 625–626.
- Léon Galibert (1846). L'Algérie ancienne et moderne. Paris: Furne et Cie, Libraires-Éditeurs. p. 602.
- Edmond Pellissier de Reynaud (1854). Annales algériennes, Volume 2. Paris: Librairie Militaire. pp. 177–180.
- Hippolyte Dumas de Lamarche (1855). Les Turcs et les Russes : histoire de la guerre d'Orient. Paris: Gustave Barba, Libraire-Éditeur. p. 26.
- Achille Fillias (1860). Histoire de la conquête et de la colonisation de l'Algérie (1830-1860). Paris: Arnauld de Vresse, Libraire-Éditeur. p. 212.
- Académie des Sciences Morales et Politiques (1865). Séances et Travaux de l'Académie des Sciences Morales et Politiques, Volume 72. Paris: Auguste Durand, Libraire. p. 115.
- Ferdinand-Philippe d'Orléans (1870). Campagnes de l'armée d'Afrique, 1835-1839. Paris: Michel Lévy Frères. pp. 270–274.
- Léon Plée (1874). Abd-El-Kader, nos soldats, nos généraux et la guerre d'Afrique. Paris: Gustave Barba, Libraire-Éditeur. p. 26.
- Henri d'Ideville (1882). Le maréchal Bugeaud: d'après sa correspondance intime et des documents inédits, Volume 2. Paris: Firmin Didotet Cie, Libraire. p. 60.
- Alphonse Michel Blanc (1885). Généraux et soldats d'Afrique. Paris: Librairie Plon. pp. 117–120.
- Ferdinand-Désiré Quesnoy (1888). L'armée d'Afrique depuis la conquête d'Alger. Paris: Jouvet et Cie, Éditeurs. pp. 117–118.
- Narcisse Faucon (1890). Le livre d'or de l'Algérie: histoire politique, militaire, administrative. Paris: Augustin Challamel, Éditeur. pp. 540–542.
- Germain Bapst (1899). Le Maréchal Canrobert: souvenirs d' un siècle, Volume 1. Paris: Librairie Plon. p. 402.
