= Raid on Reghaïa (1837) =

- Part of the French conquest of Algeria
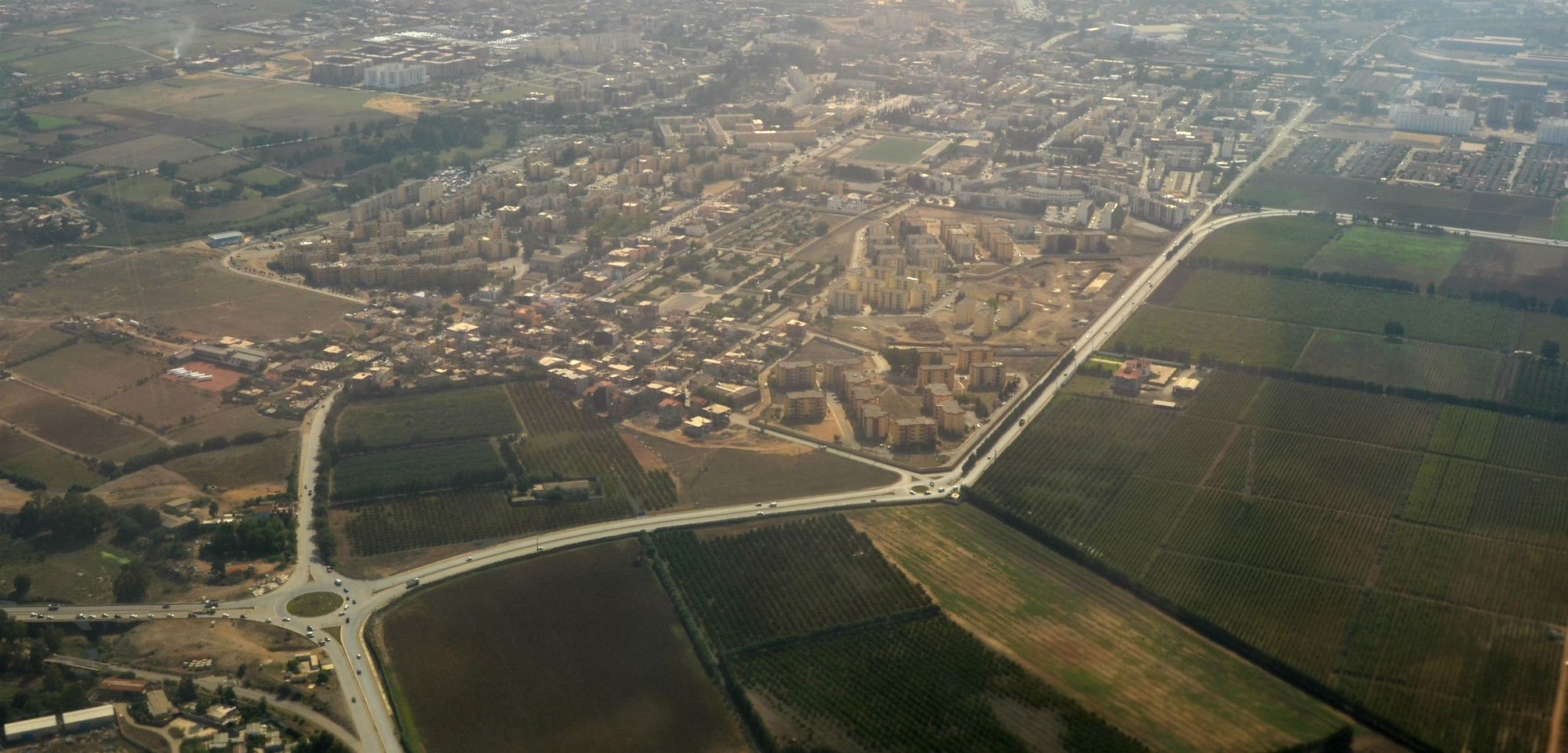
- Aerial view of the actual Reghaia
| Date | 8–9 May 1837 |
| Location | Reghaïa, Mitidja 36.7386369°N 3.338851°E |
| Result | Algerian victory |

Belligerents
| Emirate of Abdelkader: Zwawa | France |

Commanders and leaders
| Emir Abdelkader; Emir Mustapha; Cheikh Ali Boushaki (Libya) Cheikh Ben Zamoum | (France) Damrémont (France) Perrégaux (France) Schauenburg (France) La Torré |

Strength
| 500 warriors | French farmers local troops |

Casualties and losses
| Presumably none | 2 dead Several cattle stolen |

The raid on Reghaïa in May 1837, during the French conquest of Algeria, pitted the French forces in Reghaïa region against the Kabyle troops of the Igawawen confederacy.

== Background ==
Before colonization the Igawawen, also known as Zwawas served as troops under the Deylik of Algiers. Following a coup by Ali Khodja they gained more influence inside the country. In 1830 France invaded Algiers, and started the French conquest of Algeria. The Zwawa served under the armies led by Ibrahim Agha, and particularly in the Battle of Staouéli. Following the Fall of Algiers, the French started encroaching on the Mitidja region surrounding the city. Initially defeating the forces of Mostéfa Boumezrag at Médea, they were soon halted at the First Battle of Blida by Mohamed ben Zamoum. By 1837 the majority of the Mitidja was seized, and France started encroaching on the lands of the Zwawa.

== Mercier and Saussine Farm ==
After Colonel Maximilien Joseph Schauenburg (1784-1838) perpetrated the Massacre of El Ouffia in 1832, the pace of spoliation and sequestration of Algerian lands and properties increased in order to settle more French farmers in Mitidja from the year 1836. Thus, in Reghaïa, a settlement of more than 3,000 hectares was granted to two Frenchmen, called Mercier and Saussine, in order to establish a large agricultural establishment in this wet plain. The entrepreneur Mercier who had just arrived from the United States of America in 1836 was already experienced in the handling of businesses and operations of this kind.

== Attack ==
Emir Mustapha (1814–1863) organized an attack which took place from 8 May 1837 against the farm of Reghaia, located between Oued Reghaïa and Oued Hamiz within the Mitidja plain. The Zwawa confederacy, more specifically the Beni Aïcha, the Issers and the Amraoua tribes looted Reghaïa. Two French colonists were killed by the Zwawa in the agricultural fields, and a considerable amount of cattle was taken from the enclosures and transported to the region of Oued Isser. Nevertheless, the Reghaïa farm was successfully defended by its owners and the local troops against this first attack in the dividing line between Mitidja and Kabylia, as it was next during the second attack in 1839, then under Emir Abdelkader, and Ahmed ben Salem.

== See also ==
- French conquest of Algeria
- Emirate of Abdelkader
- Emir Mustapha
- Expedition of the Col des Beni Aïcha (1837)
- First Battle of Boudouaou (1837)
- First Battle of the Issers (1837)

== Bibliography ==
- Revue des deux mondes. Paris. 1836. p. 609.
- Le Spectateur militaire; Recueil de science, d'art et d'histoire militaires. Paris. 1838. p. 649.
- Hippolyte Dumas de Lamarche (1855). Les Turcs et les Russes : histoire de la guerre d'Orient. Paris: Gustave Barba, Libraire-Éditeur. p. 73.
- Louis de Baudicour (1860). Histoire de la colonisation de l'Algérie. Paris: Challamel Ainé, Libraire-Éditeur. p. 49.
- Session législative de 1870; Cahiers Algériens. Algiers: Imprimerie Duclaux. 1870. p. 107.
