= Massacre of El Ouffia =

April 1832 massacre

- Part of the French conquest of Algeria
- Native name: مجزرة العوفية
- Location: Mitidja, French Algeria
- Date: 6 April 1832
- Target: Algerians of the El Ouffia tribe
- Deaths: 100-500+
- Perpetrator: France
- No. of participants: Chasseurs d'Afrique; 300 cavalry of the French Foreign Legion
- Defender: Several members of the El Ouffia tribe
- Convicted: none

The massacre of El Ouffia (French: L'affaire d'El Ouffia) took place on 6 April 1832 during the French conquest of Algeria. It was committed against the tribe of El Ouffia near El Harrach by the Troupes Coloniales under Colonel Maximilien Joseph Schauenburg.

== Historical context ==
In December 1831, Duc de Rovigo arrived in Algiers to establish the French colonial power in Mitidja. His arrival coincided with the reconfiguration of the regiments of Troupes Coloniales involved in the offensive against the Algerian resistance fighters scattered all around the Casbah of Algiers.

Through the ordinance of 17 November 1831, the Chasseurs d'Afrique were created to establish the presence of cavalry capable of rapid incursions into the heart of rebel areas in French North Africa. Four squadrons were formed, and these regiments of horsemen immediately began targeting the insurrectionary tribes around Algiers.

The members of le 1er régiment de chasseurs d'Afrique proved to be disciplined and reliable and were placed under the command of Colonel Maximilien Joseph Schauenburg in order to guarantee the pacification of the suburbs of Algiers.

The cause of the raid was a theft committed against the entourage of Ferhat ben Said, a local leader in South Constantinois who was seeking common cause with France against Ahmad Bey, though none of the people killed in the raid were responsible for the theft but were instead thought by the French to have been from the same tribe.

== Raid on El Ouffia ==
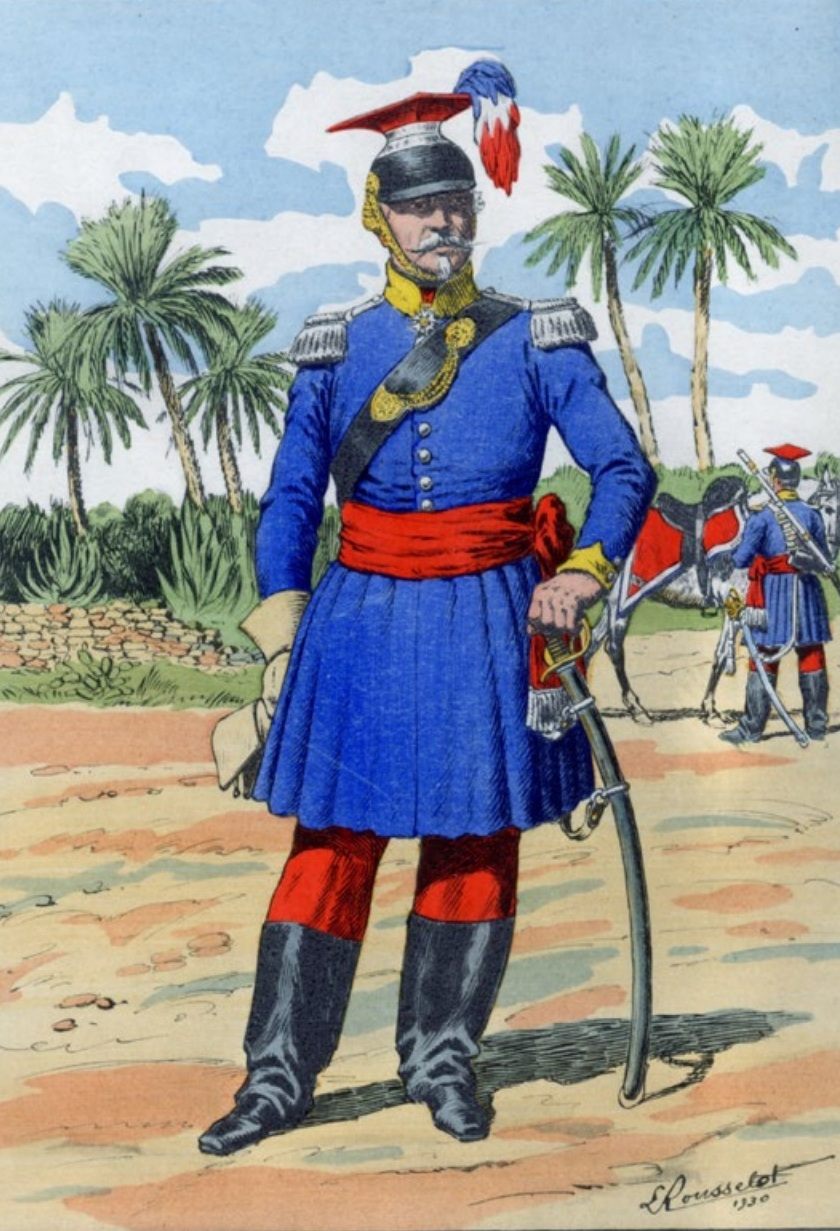
Colonel Maximilien Joseph Schauenburg, who was involved in perpetrating the massacre

Colonel Schauenburg's cavalry regiment began its raids against the tribes around Algiers (Fahs) with the attack on the tribe of El Ouffia near the course of Oued El Harrach, which had taken place on 6 April 1832, just five months after the formation of this new regiment.

While this regiment was being equipped with arms and supplies, Colonel Schauenbourg received from Governor Savary the sudden order to leave the Algiers encampment at night towards the bank of Oued El Harrach in a first mission against the Algerians.

The cavalry then began a silent nighttime march.

This column of horsemen was led by General Faudoas, who was an officer of the First French Empire like his colleague Colonel Schauenbourg, and this punitive expedition was intended to punish the tribe of El Ouffia and other neighboring allied tribes who were considered dangerous against the French colonial presence in Algiers.

== Massacre ==
General Marquis de Faudoas arrived with Colonel Schauenburg and their horsemen on the night of 6 April 1832 at the village of El Ouffia while the members of the tribe were asleep in their tents.

Due to the strict instructions of the general-in-chief, the Duc de Rovigo, this expeditionary body of troops from Algiers were tasked with slaughtering the civilians of El Ouffia without sparing women, children and the elderly.

The sleeping Algerians were surprised at dawn on 7 April 1832, and many were slain without attempting to defend themselves.

Most horsemen of General Faudoas followed orders to make no distinction regarding the age or sex of their Algerian victims. Both swords and firearms were used to kill the civilians, and there are reports that boiling water was taken from cooking pots and tossed onto the Algerians by dismounted French cavalry. Only the actions of some French soldiers in disobeying their orders saved a couple of Algerian civilians.

Upon return from this expedition, the riders of Schauenburg's regiment carried the heads of their victims at the ends of their spears into the city of Algiers. They were met with a mixed reception from the city's population

== See also ==
- French conquest of Algeria
- Pacification of Algeria
- List of massacres in Algeria
- List of French governors of Algeria
- First French Empire
- Anne Jean Marie René Savary
- Marquis de Faudoas
- Maximilien Joseph Schauenburg
- Chasseurs d'Afrique
- Origins of the French Foreign Legion

== Bibliography ==
- Revue de Paris, Tome 5. Brussels: Bureau de la Revue de Paris. 1844. p. 105.
- Léon Galibert (1844). L'Algérie ancienne et moderne. Paris: Furne et Cie, Libraires-Éditeurs. p. 409.
- P. E. de Mont-Rond (1847). Histoire de la conquête de l'Algérie de 1830 à 1847, Volume 1. Paris: E. Marc-Aurel, Éditeur. p. 141-143.
- M. J. Marcel (1850). Algérie: par les capitaines du Génie: Rozet et Carette. Paris: Firmin Didot Frères, Éditeur. p. 277.
- Joseph Nicolas Bernelle (1850). Histoire de l'ancienne Légion Étrangère créée en 1831, licenciée en 1838. Paris: Imprimerie de E. Marc-Aurel, Éditeur. p. 29.
- Edmond Pellissier de Reynaud (1854). Annales algériennes, Volume 1. Paris: Librairie Militaire. p. 247-248.
- Revue des deux mondes, Volumes 29 à 30. Paris: Bureau de la Revue des deux mondes. 1860. p. 208.
- Achille Fillias (1860). Histoire de la conquête et de la colonisation de l'Algérie (1830-1860). Paris: Arnauld de Vresse, Libraire-Éditeur. p. 122-123.
- Arthur Alexandre Behaghel (1865). L'Algérie. Histoire, géographie, climatologie. Paris: Tissier, Libraire-Éditeur. p. 400.
- Fernand Hue (1887). Le 1er régiment de chasseurs d'Afrique: 60 illustrations de Gil Baer. Paris: H. Lecène et H. Oudin, Éditeurs. p. 18.
- Charles Grad (1889). L'Alsace: le pays et ses habitants. Paris: Librairie Hachette et Cie. p. 857.
- Jacques Dhur (1899). Le père d'Émile Zola. Paris: Société libre d'édition des gens de lettres. p. 178.
