= Oued El Harrach =

River in Algeria

Coordinates: 36°44′N 3°08′E

The Wadi El Harrach is an Algerian river that originates in the Bliden, Atlas Mountains near Hammam Melouane. It is 67 kilometres (42 mi) long and flows into the Mediterranean, right in the middle of the bay of Algiers.

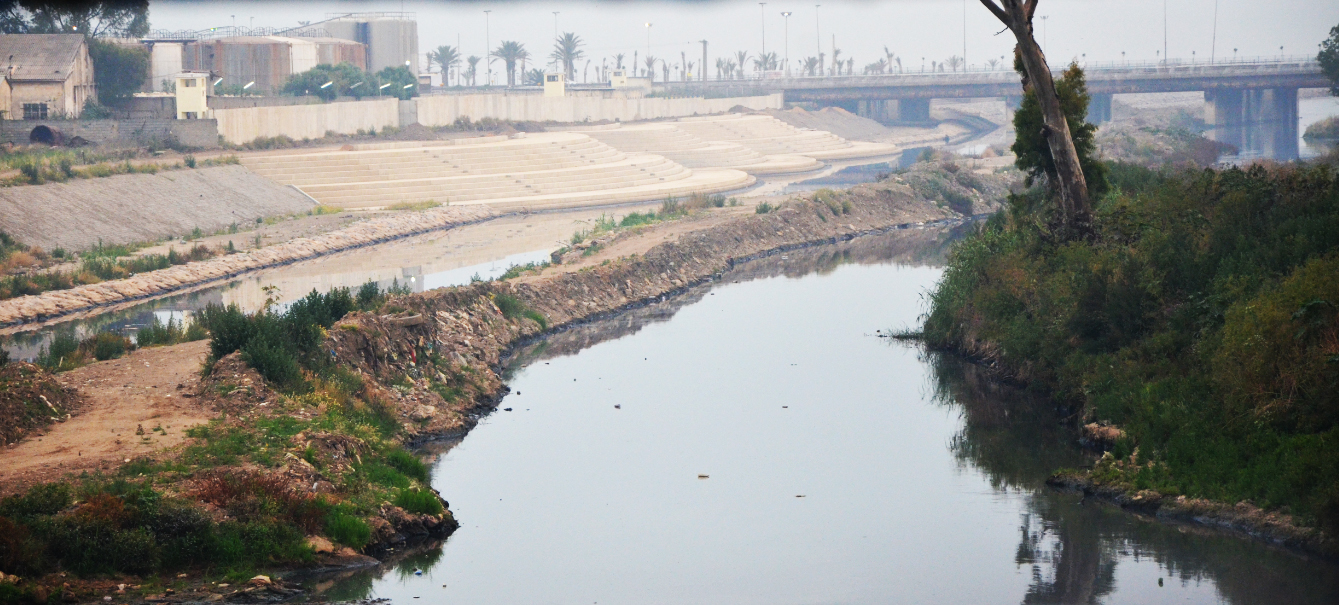
Oued el Harrach

Oued El Harrach crosses the Mitidja plain from Bougara and irrigates agricultural areas all around, thanks in particular to its tributaries and canals, Oued Djemâa, Oued Baba Ali, Oued El Terro and Wadi Semar which crosses an industrial zone Of the eastern suburbs of Algiers.

Its main tributary is the Oued El Kerma which increases the volume of the river thanks to the waters descended from the Algerian sahel.

The Oued El Harrach has an average flow of 4 to 5 cubic metres per second (140 to 180 cu ft/s) but this can rise to 3,000 m^{3}/s (110,000 cu ft/s) in times of flood.

The river flows through 9 km (5.6 mi) of Industrial Area, in Algiers, and so is now very polluted. Pollution in the river now threatens the bay of Algiers, since in 2005 a study conducted by the Japanese researcher Mitsuo Yoshida discovered lead, chlorine, zinc and chromium in large quantities discharged into the sea.

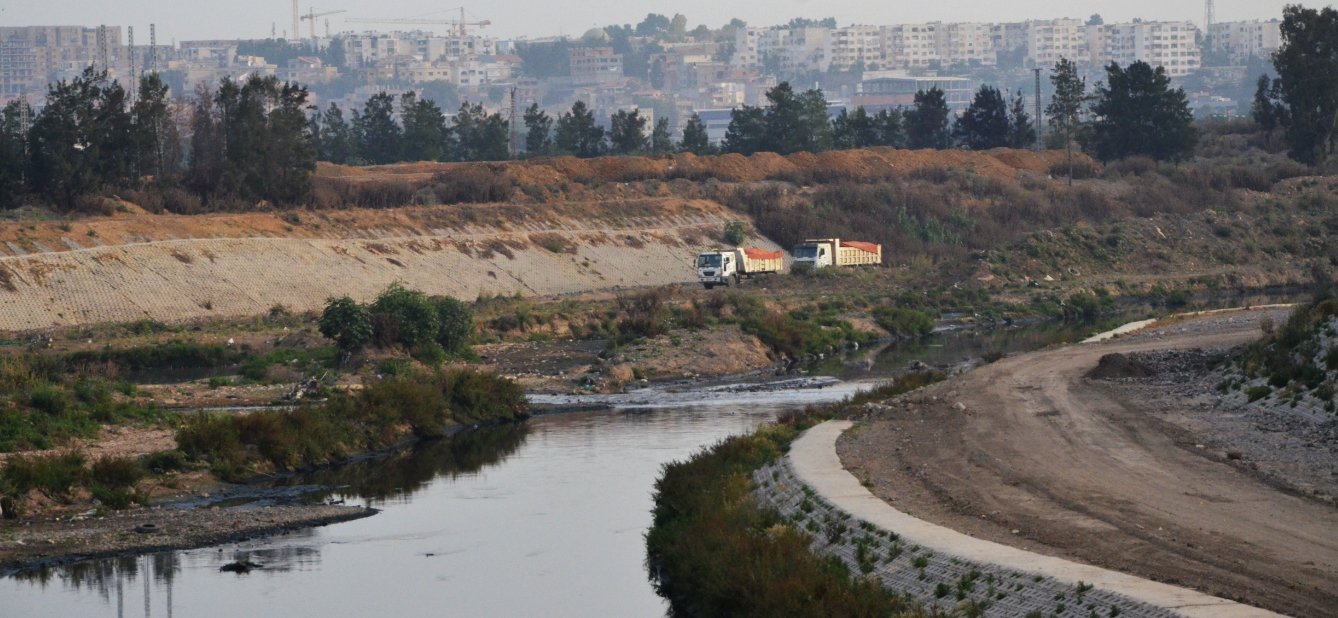
Oued El Harrach près de Semmar à Gué de Constantine

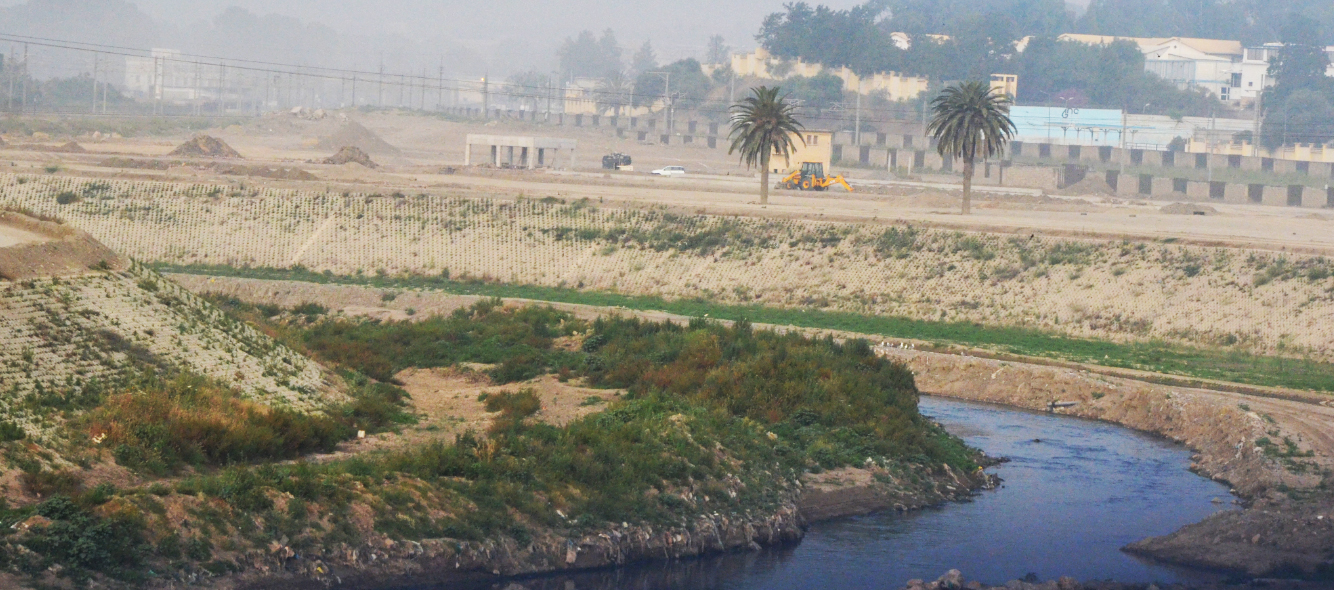
Oued El Harrach près de Baraki

== See also ==
- Massacre of El Ouffia (6 April 1832)
