= Emirate of Abdelkader =

Algerian country (1832–1847)

Emirate of Mascara إمارة معسكر (Arabic)
- 1832–1847
- Flag Seal
- Motto: "نَصْرٌ مِّنَ اللَّهِ وَفَتْحٌ قَرِيبٌ" "Victory from Allah and reconquest is near" Military motto "لَا شَيْء أَكْثَرُ فَائِدَة مِنْ التَّقْوَى وَالشَّجَاعَةَ" "Nothing is more beneficial than piety and courage"
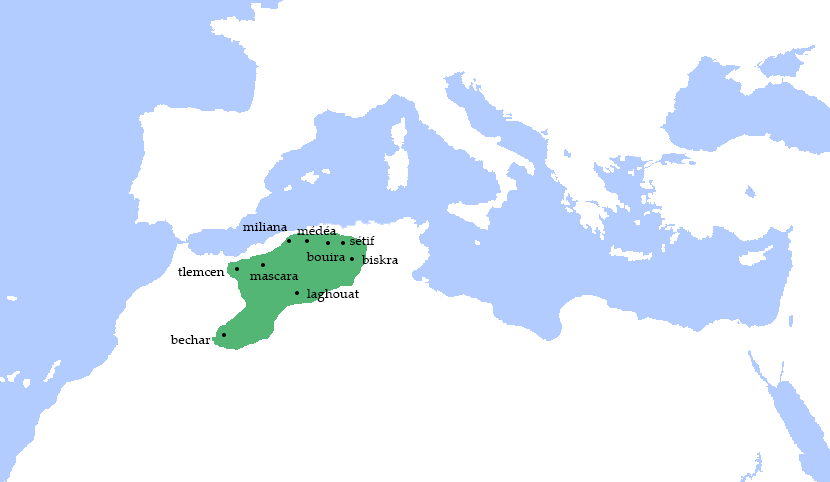
- Territories controlled by Emir Abdelkader in 1839
- Capital: Mascara (1832–1835); Tagdemt (1835–1847)
- Official languages: Arabic
- Religion: Sunni Islam
- Government: Shura
- Emir
  - 1832–1847: Emir Abdelkader
- History
  - Established: 27 November 1832
  - Desmichels Treaty: 26 February 1834
  - Treaty of Tafna: 30 May 1837
  - Surrender of Abdelkader: 23 December 1847
- Currency: Muhmadiyya
Preceded by	Succeeded by
Regency of Algiers	French Algeria
- Today part of: Algeria

The Emirate of Mascara, commonly known as the Emirate of Abdelkader, was a state founded by Emir Abdelkader with the allegiance of the people of Algeria to resist the French conquest of Algeria with its first capital at Mascara then Tagdemt after it was taken by France.

== Government ==
The system of government was simple and analogous to the regime of the deys of the Deylik of Algiers. However, it profoundly revised the doctrine of power to a more egalitarian basis. The Emir was head of the state and governed with his divan or council of ministers. He was assisted by a majlis, an advisory council of wise personalities, ulamas and khalifas representing the provinces and presided over by a qāḍī al-quḍāt, or chief justice.

Algeria was divided by Emir Abdelkader into eight khalifalik, themselves subdivided into aghalik, which grouped several qaidat. The division took into account local influences and history, especially on the tribal level.

== Economic policy ==
The Emir very early attached importance to structuring an economy, which he perceived as necessary for the perpetuation of his state. He set up a number of factories and industries in Tagdemt, his new capital. Local production of the necessary goods, especially for the war effort, was accorded great importance. The cities of Tlemcen, Mascara, Miliana, Médéa and Tagdemt made the necessary powder. Tagdemt and Miliana had foundries and weapon factories. He also wished to regulate the souqs with greater surveillance and security of the sites and trade routes to promote trade. Agriculture was encouraged, with the suppression of the kharaj to encourage the fellahs and the utilization of periods of truce. Finally, the Emir set up a currency struck at Tagdemt to ensure the financial autonomy of the state from 1834 to 1841.

== Military structure ==
The Emir realized that the power of the state is reflected by its military strength and aids in giving the state a prestigious image internationally. The Emir used the military to enforce order and security and to stop the chaos that spread after the fall of Turkish rule in Algeria.

Social organization in Algeria was mainly tribal, with individuals attached only to their tribes; nationalism was unknown at the time. In war or conflict, the tribes gathered together with their men and cavalry then went to war. Afterwards, the men returned to their tribes and continued with their daily work; military service was not enforced with the tribes. The regular army of the emir was formed of volunteers. Recruitment was open to young people from all regions and all tribes and called for jihad against the French invaders. Recruitment had no requirements and was for all ages and in all regions of the Emirate. The emir organized an army to protect the Emirate because he knew that he would confront French armies that were better-trained and better-equipped, commanded by experienced officers and generals. The emir was the first leader to establish a national army in the modern history of Algeria.

He also built factories to manufacture weapons by using the experience of the French, Spaniards and Italians.

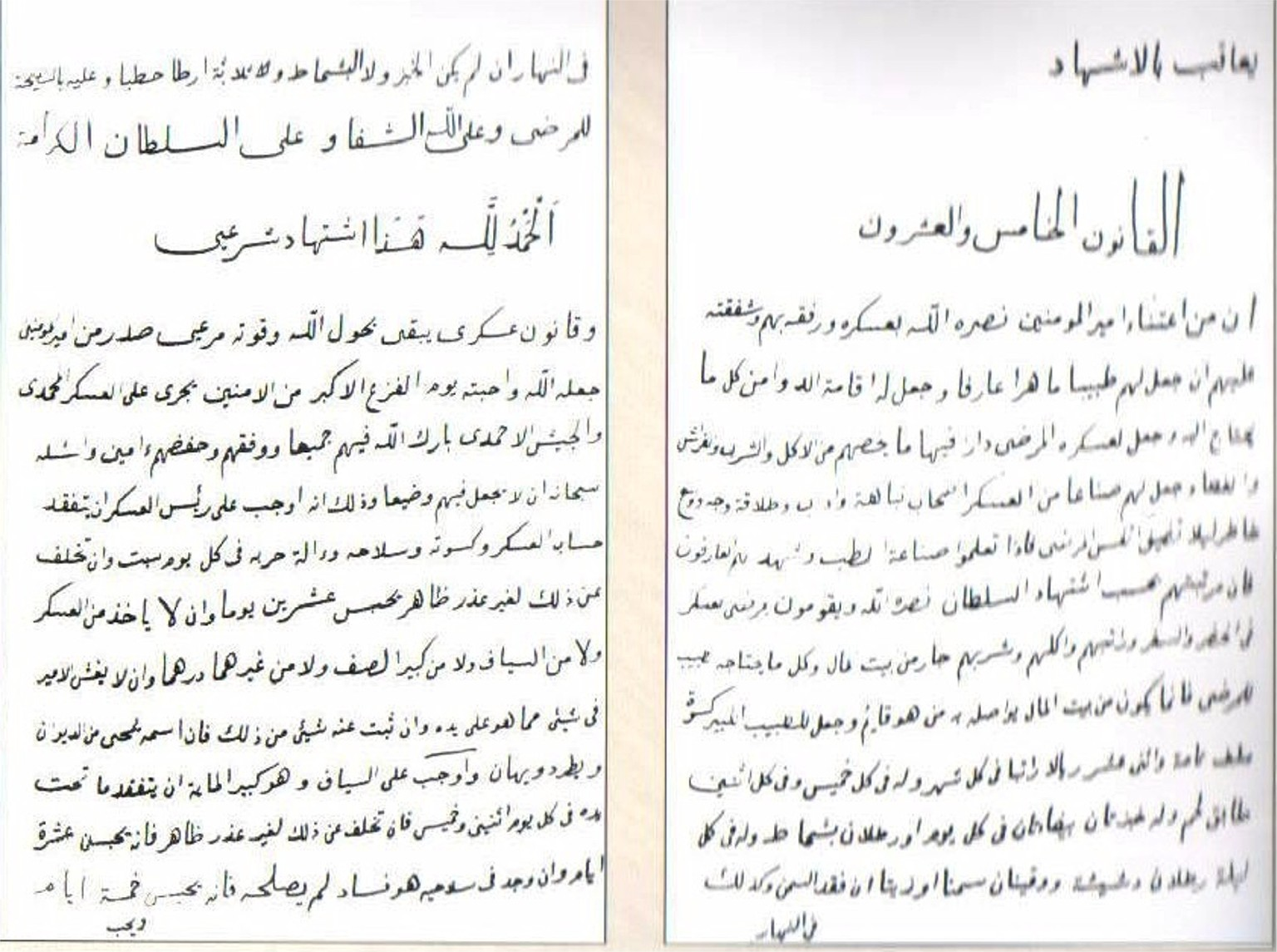
Military laws of the first Algerian resistance

He called his army Jaish al-Mohammadi (Mohammad's Army), divided into three divisions: infantry, cavalry and artillery. Then he developed military law regarding discipline, recruitment, policies, salaries and weapons. The Jaish al-Mohammadi was formed of 8,000 soldiers, 2,000 cavalry, 2,240 light cannons and 20 heavy cannons.

- Khayala (Cavalry): soldiers who fought on horseback
- Moushat (Infantry): soldiers fighting on foot
- Tobajiya (Artillery): soldiers with cannons. The artillery unit soldiers of the Jaish al-Mohammadi were deserters from the French army, Turks and Kouloughlis. They were experienced in maintaining light and heavy cannons. Each artillery unit had twelve soldiers.
  - Irregular: 10,240
  - Regular: 5,960

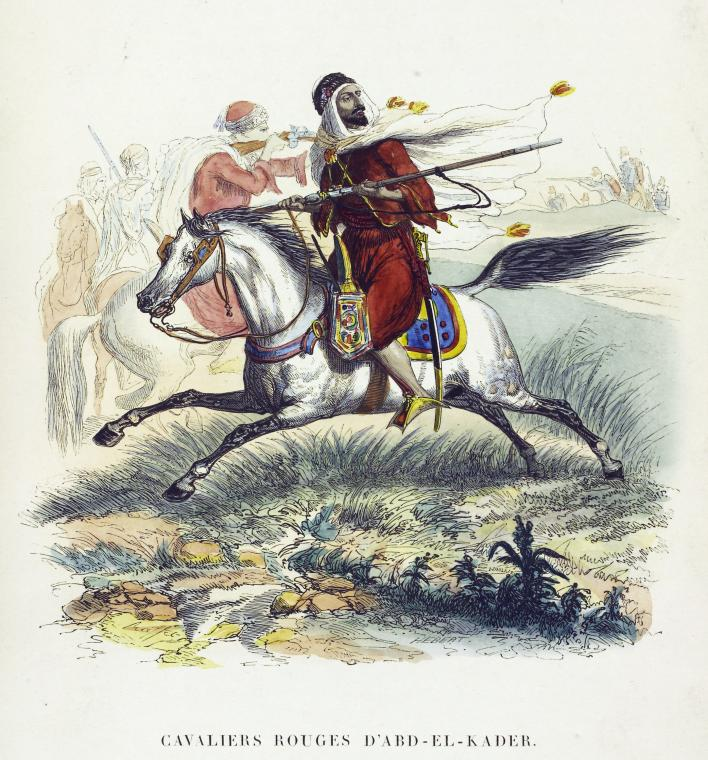
Emir Abdelkader's cavalry

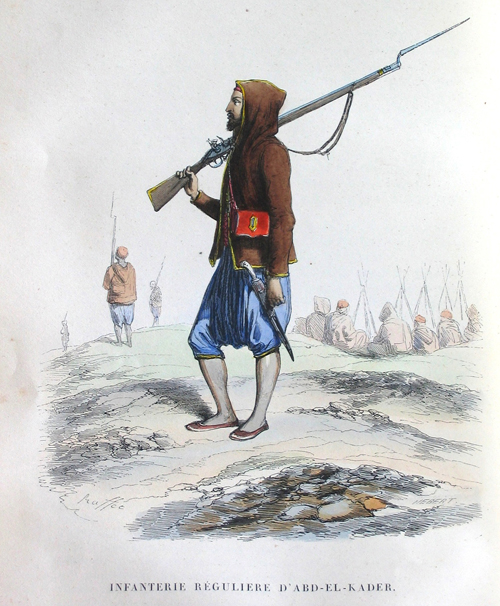
The first Algerian Resistance infantry, around 1832–1847

=== Uniform ===
Emir Abdelkader classed a unique uniform for each type of soldier, the cloth was linen and gasket. It consisted of a gray wool jacket with a hood, blue wool trousers, and a red sedria (vest). A soldier received a yellow leather shirt, shoes, and a burnous (long woolen cloak) every three months.

The cavalry uniform included a red vest adorned with blue hair and a red jacket with black stripes on the back and sleeve seams. Each cavalryman received a turban and a haik made of camel's hair that covered his head and shoulders.

=== Motto ===
" لَا شَيْء أَكْثَرُ فَائِدَة مِنْ التَّقْوَى وَالشَّجَاعَةَ " ("Nothing is more beneficial than piety and courage")

=== Weapons ===
Each soldier had a leather bag which could be worn on a belt over the right shoulder, also a rifle with a bayonet, pistols and a yatagan (curved blade) attached to his belt. The cavalrymen were armed with a rifle, yatagan and pistol.

=== Food ===
As food, each soldier received two kesra loaves (Algerian bread) and a kilogram of flour and semolina to cook couscous twice a week. Each group of 20 men shared a sheep between them.

=== Wages ===
The wage of a soldier was paid from April to June monthly depending on rank:

- Agha (General) 22 Budjus
- Sayaf (First Lieutenant) 12 Budjus
- Rais Sayaf (Lieutenant) 8 Budjus
- Jaouche (Corporal) 7 Budjus
- Khaba (Captain) 6 Budjus

Budju: a currency used by the Turks in Algeria 1 Boudjou = 50 Mohammadia

=== Housing ===
In the garrison, soldiers often lived in rooms that had mats and carpets. In camp, about 20 soldiers lived in a war tent.

=== Rankings ===
Each badge of embroidered sword on attached on each shoulder of the following soldiers including silver rings on their left hand.

- Agha (General) 4 Gold Badges
- Sayaf (First Lieutenant) 2 Gold Badges
- Rais Sayaf (Lieutenant) 2 Silver Badges
- Jaouche (Corporal) 1 Silver Badge
- Khaba (Captain) 1 Bronze Badge

=== Command units ===
- Emir's Bodyguards – 500 men – commanded by Emir Abdelkader
- Katiba (Battalion) – 1000 men – commanded by an Agha
- Sariya (Company) – 100 men – commanded by a sayaf
- Fasela (Platoon) – 35 men – commanded by a khaba

He also sought to import weapons from the only country that opposed the French invasion of Algeria, Britain, but failed. The Emir endeavoured to build an arsenal of ammunition and weapons in both Mascara and Tagdemt with the assistance of foreign experts from Spain, France and Italy. The Emir also established factories to produce ammunition and weapons in the best fully-fortified strategic locations like the city of Miliana.

The Emir's army also used weapons captured from the French. Abdelkader trained his army well and exploited the terrain with which he and his troops were familiar. The Emir extensively resorted to guerrilla warfare against the invading forces and often resorted to ambushes.

== Provinces ==
Abdelkader divided his emirate into administrative provinces to facilitate management and ease the burden on the central government.

Provinces of the Emirate of Abdulkader
Province	Governor	Capital
Titteri	Emir Mustapha; Mohammed Barkani	Médéa
Miliana	Muhieddine Ben Alal Al-Qaleyi	Miliana
Tlemcen	Mohammed Bouhamedi	Tlemcen
Mascara	Ahmed Ben Al-Tahami	Mascara
Sahara	Gadour Ben Abdelbaqi	Laghouat
Mejdana	Mohammed Ben Abdelsalam Al-Maqdani	Sétif
Ziban	Ferhat Ben Saeed	Biskra
Jibal	Emir Mustapha; Ahmed Ben Salem	Bouïra

Each province was divided into districts, which were further divided into groups of tribes. The head of a district was called the Agha, and the Sheikh was the head of a group of tribes.

== Flag and emblem ==
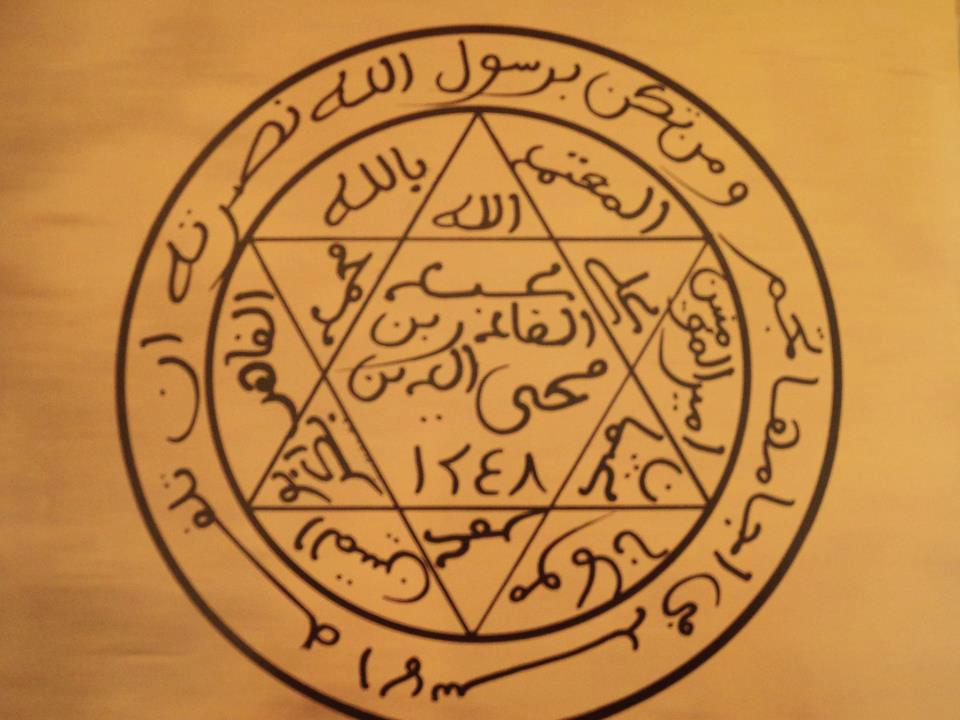
Emblem of the emirate of abdelkader

=== Flag ===
Abdelkader designed a banner with green silk bars above and below a center of white silk. A hand drawn on the white center was surrounded by golden words "victory from Allah and the reconquest is near, and the victory by Emir Abdelkader"

=== Emblem ===
The emblem of the state was a hexagram, with writings around its circumference: Allah, Mohammed, Abu Bakr, Omar, Othman and Ali. In the middle of the star Nasir Al-Din Emir Adbelkader Ben Muhieddine is written.

== Administration ==
=== Education ===
Education was a primary concern of the Emir. He believed that in developing this field to take care of books and references, whatever their scientific or literary value. Therefore, the Emir attempted his best to collect books on different subjects by buying, copying or transporting them.

The Emir also issued strict orders to his soldiers not to mishandle or disrespect books, and breaking those orders was severely punished. He also used to reward them for bringing a book or the author. To copy one manuscript would take several months, which was a long time for the Emir because of the war against the French colonisers.

This policy had great success in bringing books from different fields to his emirate, the Emir also build a library to store and organize these books that he had gathered but he also linked the library with many organizations in the emirate like schools, masjids and zāwiyas (religious schools), the library was open to everyone: students, scholars and even soldiers. He also used to store a huge number of manuscripts in fortress of Tagdemt, where he used to keep not only manuscripts but also classified state documents and diplomatic letters.

The Emir took care of books and manuscripts even in war; he transported all the books and manuscripts that had been stored in fortress of Tagdemt to his personal encampment (Arabic: زمالة zmālah, romanised as "the Smala") after the fortress fell to French invaders, nevertheless, French soldiers seized the books and manuscripts after the Battle of the Smala in 1843. The Emir chose qualified teachers to improve the education in the emirate, he supported the teachers financially and morally and paid them wages depending on their qualifications as he also built schools across his emirate in villages, towns and cities.

During the fall of the emirate, its manuscripts were looted by the French and brought to the Château de Chantilly although some were lost. The first full catalogue of the 39 surviving manuscripts was published in 2022; the authors observe that the texts have historical value and have never been completely analyzed.

=== Judicial system ===
After establishing the emirate and its administrative divisions, the emir appointed to each region a qadi to rule in accordance with the Maliki school of fiqh. Justice is the basis of governance and so he set requirements for judges: to be honest, just, chaste and practise Islam.

To ensure that the judiciary ran well, the Emir paid each judge a respectable monthly wage of 100 douro (50 francs) and additional payments based on the type of case he judged. The Emir separated the civil and military judiciary, then appointed for each department a special judge to decide the issues and cases. The judge could be elected only for a single year.

The emir also recruited two clerics to each regional councils. The senior cleric studied fatwas (legal judgments) issued by the judge of a particular region then sent them to Mascara for deeper study. The Emir linked all the judges in the regions to review their cases with the qāḍī al-quḍāt Ahmed ben Al-Hashemi Al-Mrahi.

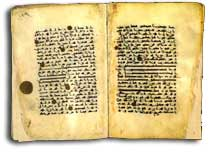
Manuscripts 'Emirate of Abdelkader'

The Emir also wanted the provisions of the civil and military judiciary to come under sharia, which the Emir made the source for rule in the Emirate. Its provisions derive from the Quran, Sunnah and ijtihad and reminded the people of the days of the Rashidun Caliphate. He considered the success of the new established Emirate to have been removing the corruption inherited from the Turks, working to change the old relations and unifying the Algerian people. This policy united the Algerians, helping him to later face the French invasion.

Immediately, especially if there was a threat against the homeland such as an enemy, response to threats intended to deter others with no appeal. “He who helps the enemy financially will be financially punished (fines) and the one who helps the enemy physically will be punished by decapitation (executions),” he said.

In justice and security, people therefore lived peacefully under the flag of a popular national emirate, crime vanished and calm returned after the chaos that had followed the fall of Turkish rule in Algeria. The Emir also fought ethical corruption in society, banning prostitution, drinking alcohol and drugs across his emirate, and he also banned soldiers from playing cards and wearing gold and silver except in their weapons and horses and ordered them to pray at the mosque.

The Emir said, “Know that the only purpose of my acceptance of this position (Emir) only that you will be safe on yourselves and your honour and your wealth assured on your country enjoying your religious duties and I cannot reach that except with your help by money or men.”

== See also ==
- French conquest of Algeria
- Reghaïa attack (1837)
- Expedition of the Col des Beni Aïcha (1837)
- First Battle of Boudouaou (1837)
- History of Algeria
- Ottoman Algeria
- Algerian War

== Bibliography ==
- Emirate of Abdelkader, Military Structure
- Abd el-Kader, chef de guerre (1832–1847), par Jacques Frémeaux, dans: Revue historique des armées, n.250 (2008), pp. 100–107 1
- Algérie: le passé, l'Algérie française, la révolution, 1954–1958, par Jacques Simon - Éditions L'Harmattan, 2007 Analyse de l’État d'Abd el Kader pp. 45-48
- Abd el Kader, sa vie politique et militaire, par Alexandre Bellemare Hachette 1863 Organisation de son État, par Abd el Kader lui-même pp. 221-241
- Histoire d'el Hadj Abd el Kader (1848), par El Hossin ben Ali ben Ali Taleb cousin de l'émir, dans - Revue Africaine - 1876 pp. 419–455 (Récit autobiographique par un cavalier d'Abd el Kader, 1832 à 1844)
- Organisation du territoire d'Abd-el-Kader (read online (french))
- L'État d'Abd-el-Kader et sa puissance en 1841, d'après le rapport du sous-intendant militaire Massot (read online (french))
- مقاومة الأمير عبد القادر 1832–1847
- بيعة الأمير عبد القادر
- الجزائريون يتذكّرون مبايعة الأمير عبد القادر
