= Maximilien Joseph Schauenburg =

French Army officer

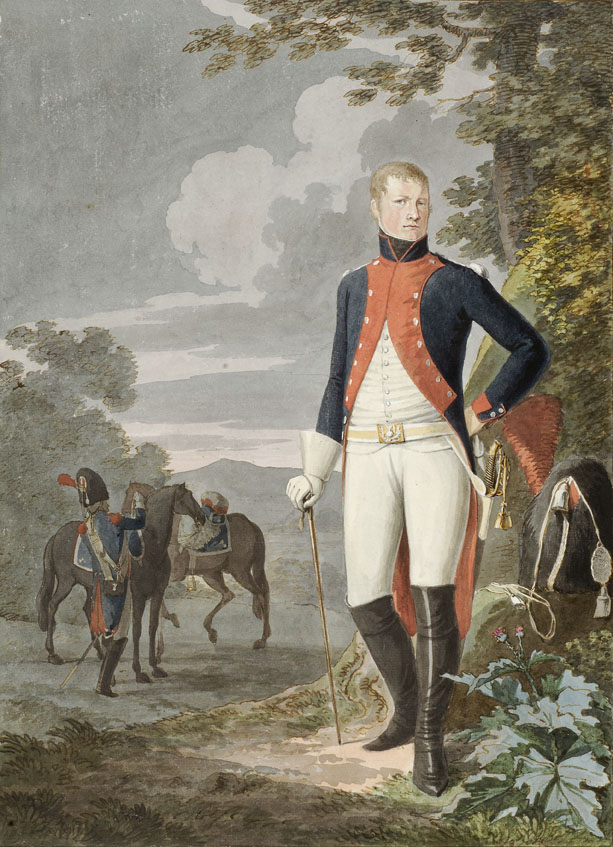
- Born: Maximilien Joseph Schauenburg; 30 April 1784; Saint Stephen's Church, Strasbourg
- Died: 19 September 1838 (aged 54); Paris, France
- Spouses: Caroline De Berckheim (d. 1827); Hortense (Ursule) De Lorme
- Children: Pierre Maximilien Arthur Schauenburg
- Military career
- Allegiance: French First Republic; First French Empire; Kingdom of France
- Branch: French Revolutionary Army; French Imperial Army; French Royal Army; French Army
- Service years: 1797–1837
- Rank: Maréchal de camp
- Conflicts: French Revolutionary and Napoleonic Wars; French conquest of Algeria; Massacre of El Ouffia; Raid on Reghaïa (1837); Expedition of the Col des Beni Aïcha; First Battle of Boudouaou; First Battle of the Issers
- Awards: Order of Saint Louis; Legion of Honour

Maréchal de camp Maximilien Joseph Schauenburg (30 April 1784 – 19 September 1838) was a French Army officer who served in the French Revolutionary and Napoleonic Wars and the French conquest of Algeria.

== Family ==
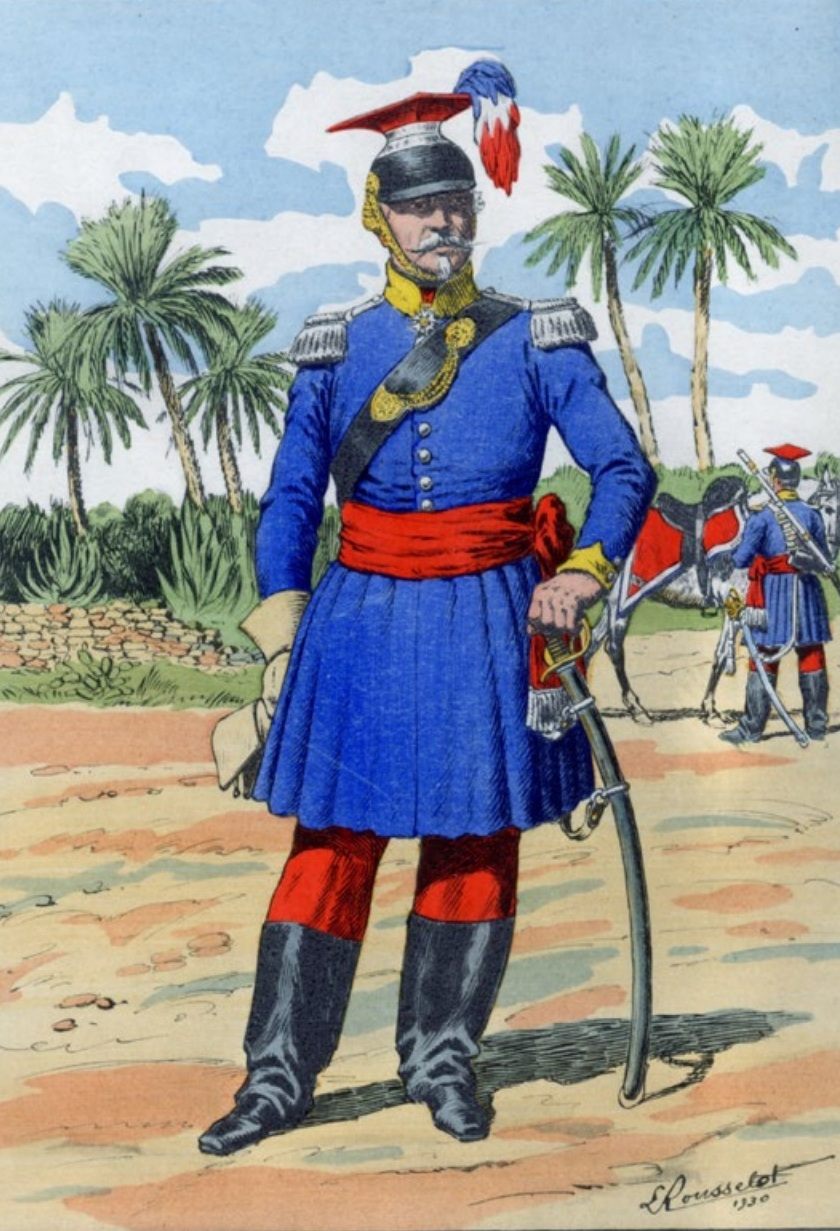
Schauenburg in Algeria

Born on 30 April 1784 in Saint Stephen's Church near Strasbourg, he is the son of Alexis Balthazar Henri Schauenburg (1748-1831) and Sophie Louise Albertini d'Ichtersheim.

Before 1825 he married Octavia Françoise Caroline de Berckheim who died in 1827, then he remarried in 1829 with Ursule Hortense Delorme (1799-1871), of whom he had an only son Pierre Maximilien Arthur Schauenburg.

== Publications ==
Maximilien Joseph Schauenburg wrote several contributions in the military field, including:

- Translation from German in 1821 of the work "Tactics of the cavalry" (French: Tactique de la cavalerie) by Count Friedrich Wilhelm von Bismarck (1783–1860).
- "From the Company Squadron" (French: De l'Escadron Compagnie) on 12 February 1835 and published in the magazine "Le Spectateur Militaire".
- "Clothing and harness of the light cavalry" (French: De l'habillement et du harnachement de la cavalerie légère) on 6 November 1834 and published in the magazine "Le Spectateur Militaire".
- "From the employment of the cavalry to war" (French: De l'emploi de la cavalerie à la guerre), Gaultier-Laguionie, 1838, 128 p.

== Awards ==
Maximilien Joseph Schauenburg was decorated with several medals during his military career, including:

- Knight of the Order of Saint Louis.
- Officer of the Legion of Honour.

== See also ==
- List of people from Strasbourg
- French conquest of Algeria
- Massacre of El Ouffia (1832)
- Raid on Reghaïa (1837)
- Expedition of the Col des Beni Aïcha (1837)
- First Battle of Boudouaou (1837)
- First Battle of the Issers (1837)

== Bibliography ==
- Maximilien Joseph Schauenburg (1838). De l'emploi de la cavalerie à la guerre. Paris: Gaultier-Laguionie. p. 128.
