= Mitidja =

Plain in Northern Algeria

Mitidja Tamazight: ⵎⵜⵜⵉⵊⵜ Arabic: متيجة
- Plain
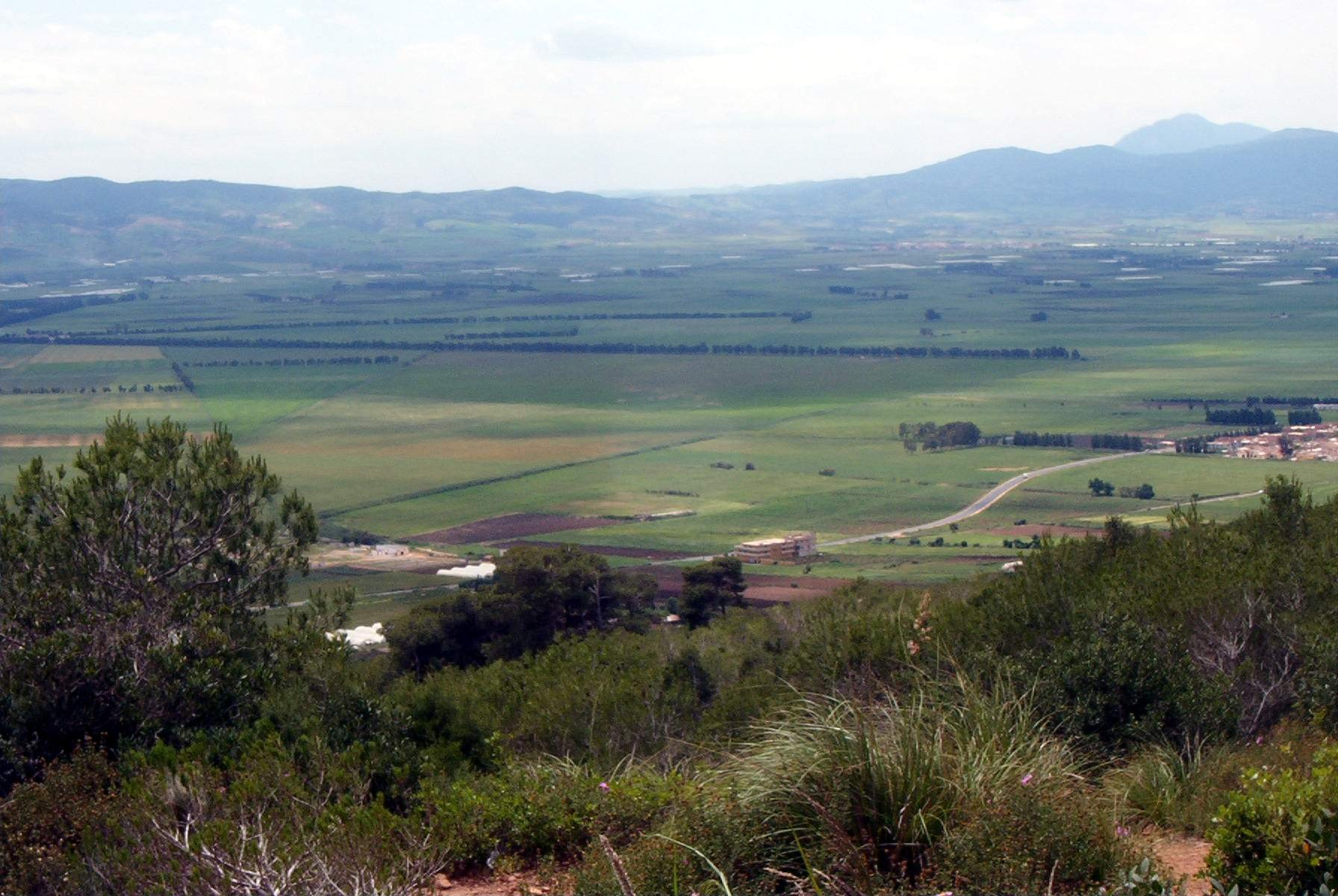
- Mitidja plain

- Location within Algeria
- Coordinates: 36°36′0″N 2°54′0″E
- Location: Algerian provinces of Tipaza, Blida, Algiers, Boumerdès, Médéa.

Mitidja, (Tamazight: Mettijet, ⵎⵜⵜⵉⵊⵜ),(Arabic: متيجة) is a plain stretching along the outskirts of Algiers in northern Algeria. It is about 100 km (62 mi) long, with a width of 5 to 20 km (3.1 to 12.4 mi). Traditionally devoted largely to agriculture and serving as the breadbasket of Algiers, the area has in recent decades become increasingly urbanized with the expansion of Algiers.

== Etymology ==
Mitidja dis derived from the primitive berber word iṭij meaning shining, this had given rise to the word Mitidja, "the Sunny".

== Geography ==
The Mitidja plain is bounded on the east by the Boudouaou River, on the west by the Nador River, on the north by the hills of the Algiers Sahel, and on the south by the Blidean Atlas range. It stretches about 100 km (62 mi) from east to west, with a width varying from 5 to 20 km (3.1 to 12.4 mi) At an average altitude of 50 m (160 ft), it slopes very slightly towards the sea.

Its fertile soils enjoy a temperate Mediterranean climate with adequate rainfall, and are devoted largely to the cultivation of citrus fruits in east and grapes in the west.

From west to east, the plain traverses the wilayas (provinces) of Tipaza, Blida, Algiers, Boumerdès, and the north-eastern corner of Médéa. Four important urban centers are located along its edges: Algiers to the north, Blida to the south, Boumerdès to the east and Tipaza to the west, while Boufarik occupies the centre of the plain itself.

== Bibliography ==
- Côte, Marc (1996). Guide d'Algérie : paysages et patrimoine. Media-plus. ISBN 9961-922-00-X.
- Côte, Marc (2009). L'Algérie et la France. R. Laffont. pp. 605–606. ISBN 9782221109465.
- MATE; CAR/PAP (2006). "Priority Actions Programme" (PDF). www.pap-thecoastcentre.org.
