= Battle of the Col des Beni Aïcha (1846) =

- Part of the French conquest of Algeria
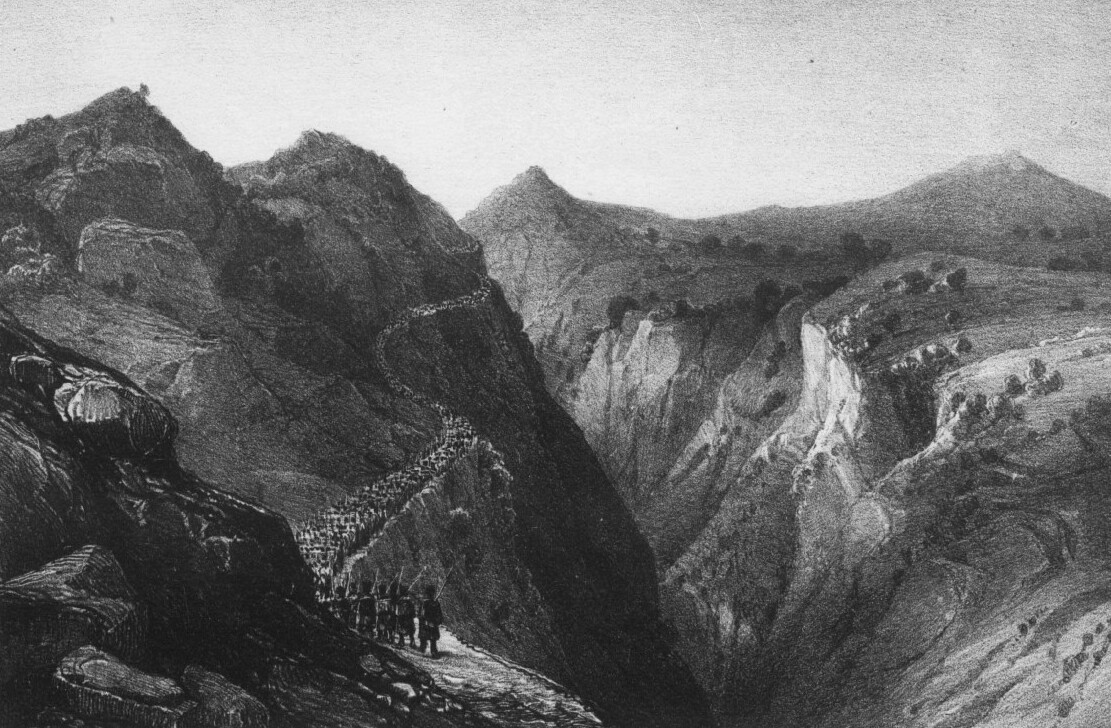
- Meraldene valley in Thénia
Date	3 February – 7 February 1846
Location	Thénia, Algeria 36.7246254°N 3.5568208°E
Result	French victory

Belligerents
Emirate of Mascara: (Libya) Islamic Zawiyas; Rahmaniyya	French Empire

Commanders and leaders
Ahmed bin Salem; Belkacem Oukaci; Ali Boushaki	(France) Bugeaud (France) Daumas (France) Gentil (France) Bedeau (France) Bar (France) Arbouville (France) Blangini

Strength
1,000 warriors	800 infantrymen

The Battle of the Col des Beni Aïcha or Battle of Thénia, which broke out on 3 February 1846, was a battle of the French conquest of Algeria between the Algerian rebels, and the France, which was the colonial power in the region since 1830.

== Historical context ==
From November 1845 to July 1846, Emir Abdelkader went back and forth between Taguine, Tiaret and Frenda in the southwest of the Casbah of Algiers in order to organize the resistance of the Emirate of Abdelkader (1808–1883) against the troupes coloniales of General Thomas Robert Bugeaud (1784–1849).

The Emir then simulates that he is heading towards the Algerian Sahara in order to create a diversion in the French Army, and he then ricochets back through the Hodna Mountains towards Kabylia to join his khalifa named Ahmed bin Salem (1802-1846).

Abdelkader aimed to raise again the Kabyles tribes of Djurdjura against the colonial power of Algiers and in all the plain of Mitidja.

== Garrison of the Beni Aïcha ==
Marshal Bugeaud then asked for a reinforcement of some companies of light infantry which had then arrived from France in Algiers in order to counter the imminent offensive of the Kabyles of the Khachna Massif in Mitidja under the instigation of Emir Abdelkader and his allies at marabouts and zawiyas in the Igawawen region.

These regular military companies were then placed at the disposal of General Adrien Aimé Fleury de Bar (1783-1861) in order to stifle the Kabyle insurrectionary inclinations.

Thus, following the indications given by Marshal Bugeaud at the time of the first symptoms of agitation in the Col des Beni Aïcha, General de Bar had sent these infantry troops under the orders of General Jean-François Gentil (1789-1852), who commanded and watched over east of Algiers the entrance to Mitidja from lower Kabylia, to occupy the valley of Oued Meraldene in this Col des Beni Aïcha.

General Gentil's military column then had the task of establishing a surveillance garrison in the Col des Beni Aïcha in order to ward off a major Kabyle raid which could come from the valley of Oued Issers.

General de Bar, who had the command of Algiers ad interim while General Bugeaud was on an expedition in the Titteri massif, thus established a surveillance camp among the Beni Aïcha composed of the only two battalions of regular forces who had remained for guard of the city of Algiers.

The garrison of General Gentil was thus supposed to cover and protect the east of Mitidja by observing all the outlets of the mountains of the steep and winding Khachna massif.

This column initially established its garrison camp on the course of the Oued Corso from where it could easily monitor the Beni Aïcha pass and the danger that can come from the Issers valley.

== Beginning of the uprising ==
Colonel Eugène Daumas (1803-1871), director-general of Arab affairs in the governorate of the Algérois, then established disturbing reports which denounced the existence of active propaganda by agents subservient to Emir Abdelkader in Kabylia.

The excitement in Kabylia had pushed Marshal Bugeaud's collaborators to remember the previous invasion of Emir Abdelkader in 1839 and the devastation of the Mitidja plain that followed.

Colonel Daumas urgently needed to provide for the defense of Mitidja and prevent at all costs the return of such a disaster at the gate of Algiers emanating from the mountains of Kabylia.

This rebellious turmoil in Kabylia dates from January 1846 when Emir Abdelkader had joined the region of Ouled Naïl and Hodna to the east of Oran and in the south of the Hautes Plaines where he joined the stronghold of his former khalifa Ahmed bin Salem.

Ben Salem brought several chiefs devoted to his cause to pledge allegiance to Emir Abdelkader, and all of them painted and guaranteed that the invasion of the Mitidja was very easy by its eastern end through the Col des Beni Aïcha.

Ben Salem then presented his stratagem based on the absence of any permanent military post on this side, certified that the column of the Oued Corso was only made up of sick and convalescents incapacitated to put up serious resistance to the Kabyle rebels.

Indeed, the effervescence east of the Mitidja was vital for the Emir Abdelkader who was surrounded and barred everywhere else in Algeria, and he then resolved to attempt the bold blow that was offered to him at the eastern gate of the Mitidja.

He then immediately formed an imposing mass of cavalry with his regular soldiers to which he added auxiliary goums taken from the Ouled Naïl and some other neighboring tribes in order to advance with them towards the Col des Beni Aïcha.

The column of Emir Abdelkader then marched north-east of Hodna towards the region of Bouira through the lands of the tribe of Ouled Aziz which was allied with him and always well disposed in his favor.

Abdelkader veers towards the heights of Boghni before going down to the Kabyles of Flissas and Beni Khalfoun, and he finally arrives in Tamdiret near Oued Djemâa, in the plain of Issers where he is preparing to rush on the Col des Beni Aïcha.

Sheikh Belkacem Oukaci and Sheikh Ali Boushaki rallied him at the head of a certain number of insurgents from the Amraoua and Beni Aïcha tribes, as well as with Kabyle chiefs adhering to the resistant mission.

== Battle ==
Ahmed bin Salem began on 2 February 1846 to raid all the villages of the Issers valley which did not want to participate in the attack on General Gentil's encampment near the Col des Beni Aïcha.

After having pacified the perimeter giving access to the Issers valley, Abdelkader's allies began the offensive against the French garrison on the following 3 February.

On the day of 5 February, General Gentil was in his encampment on the Oued Corso, learned that Ben Salem had arrived from the heights of the Issers with a fairly large cavalry, and had raided the douars on the east bank of Oued Isser and was preparing to attack the Col des Beni Aïcha and the French soldiers who were encamped there.

This general immediately went ahead of an offensive in order to force the Kabyles to retrograde towards the east and to give him up part of his prizes raided among the allies of the French.

== Escape of Emir Abdelkader ==
After the outcome of the battle of the Col des Beni Aïcha on 7 February 1846 and the victory of General Gentil against the Kabyle troops of Khalifa Ahmed bin Salem, the Emir Abdelkader then fled to find refuge in southern Algeria.

Abdelkader then took refuge temporarily in Boghni before crossing the territory of the Guechtoulas before heading south to escape General Bugeaud who was pursuing him without managing to capture him.

== Gallery ==
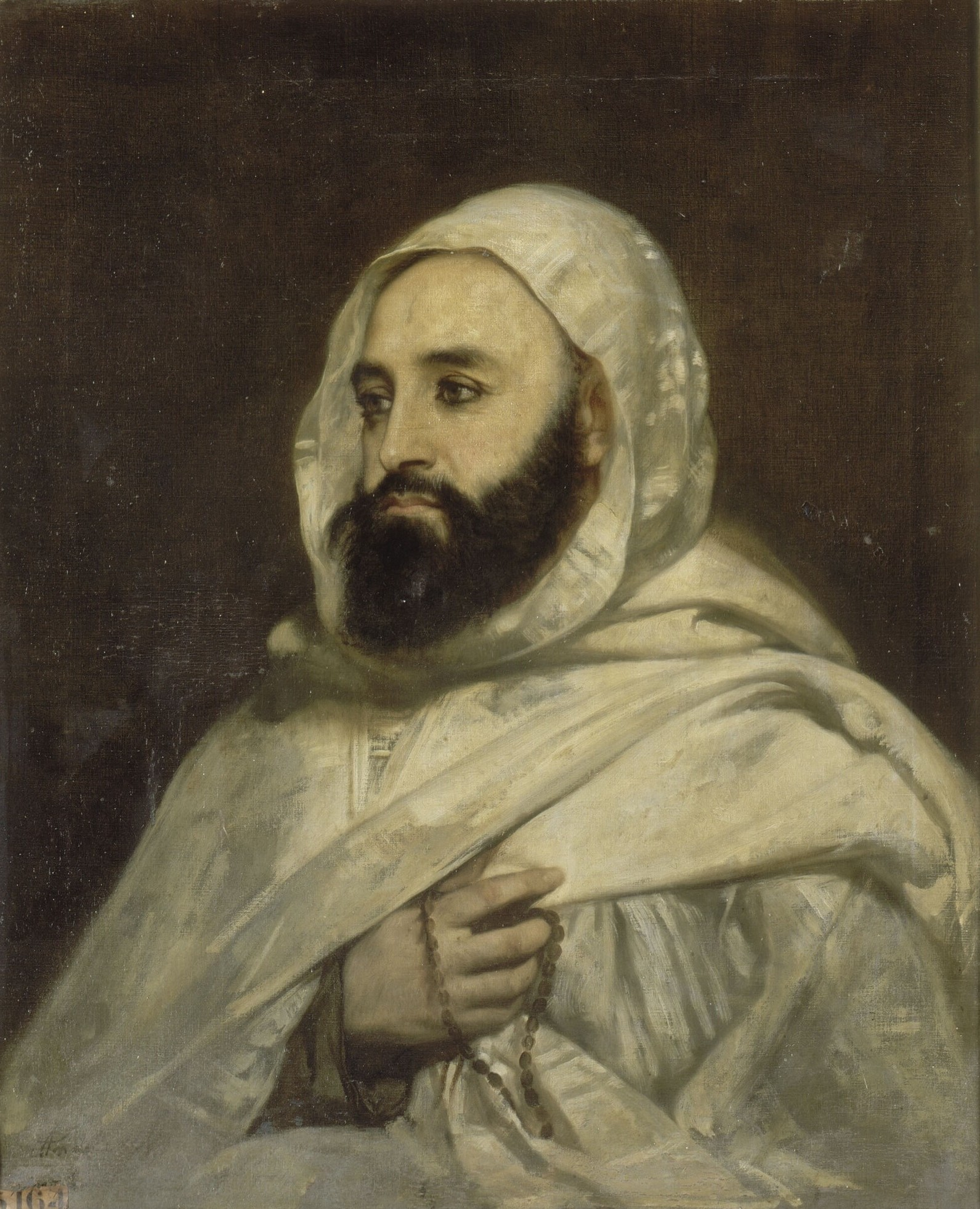
Emir Abdelkader

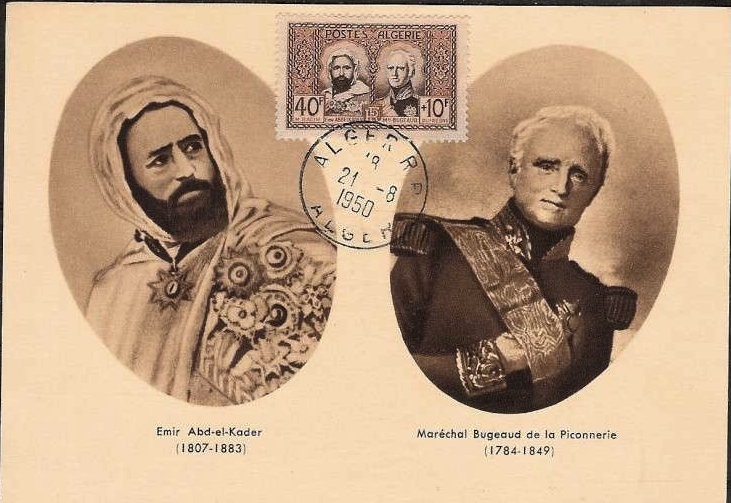
Abdelkader and Bugeaud

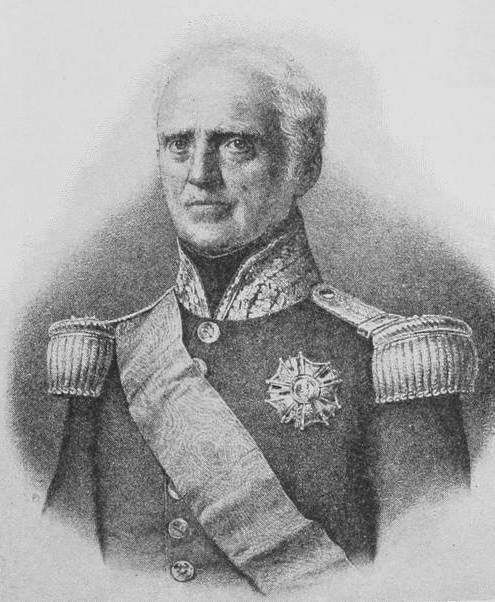
Thomas Robert Bugeaud

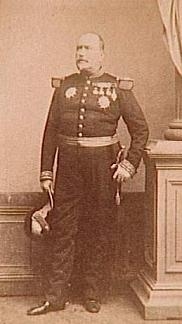
Eugène Daumas

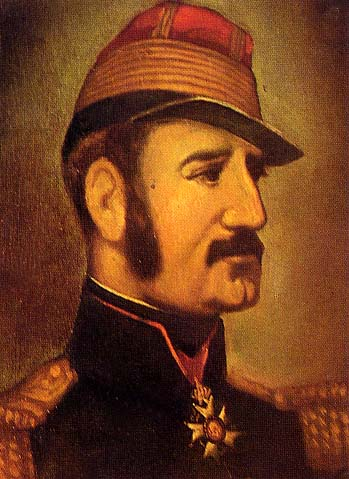
Marie Alphonse Bedeau

== See also ==
- French conquest of Algeria
- Emir Mustapha
- Marie Alphonse Bedeau
