= Battle of Beni Mered =

- Part of French conquest of Algeria
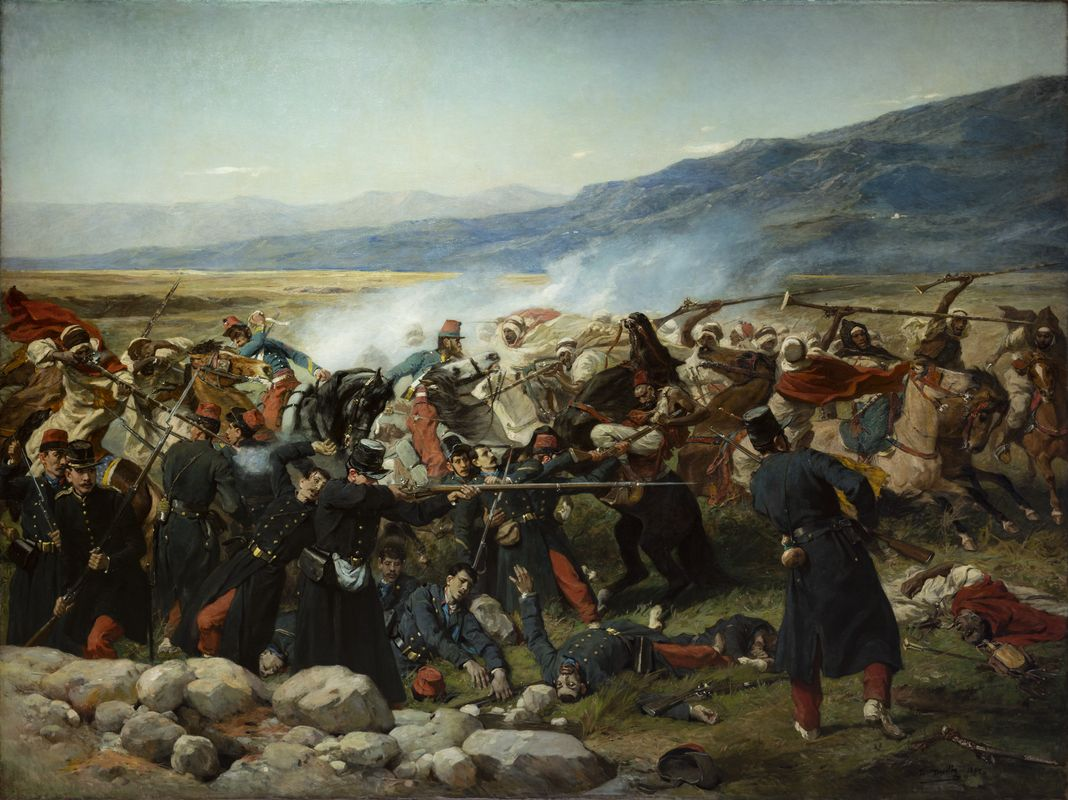
| Date | 11–12 April 1842 |
| Location | Béni Mered, Algeria 36.6980434°N 3.7325224°E |
| Result | Algerian victory |

Belligerents
| France | Emirate of Abdelkader |

Commanders and leaders
| Sergent Blandan † | Ahmed bin Salem |

Strength
| 21 | 300 Berber horsemen |

Casualties and losses
| 7 killed 9 wounded | Unknown |

The Battle of Beni Mered took place in April 1842 between the French forces and the Algerian resistance from southern Algiers (Boufarik to Beni Mered in Blida Province). The French had established a military reserve camp around the town of Beni Mered between Blida and Boufarik.

The Berber horsemen under Ahmed bin Salem extended their operations from the region of Kabylia to the Mitidja Plain in early 1842 by attacking the French forces around the area of Béni Mered.The attack took place on April 11, 1842, not far from the French military reserve camp, against a detachment of 22 French soldiers under the command of Sergent Blandan. About 300 Berber horsemen under Ahmed bin Salem attacked and annihilated the French detachment. When reinforcements under lieutenant-colonel Morris arrived, forcing the Algerians to withdraw, only five men were still standing.
