= Battle of Tadmaït =

Battle between the Emirate Of Mascara and the French Army

- Part of French conquest of Algeria
Date	25–28 April 1844
Location	Tadmait, Algeria
Result	Algerian victory

Belligerents
Emirate of Mascara	France

Commanders and leaders
Ahmed ben Salem	(France) Thomas Robert Bugeaud (France) Jean-François Gentil

Strength
Unknown	6,000 – 8,000

Casualties and losses
Significant	32

The Battle of Tadmaït took place between the Emirate Of Mascara against the French Army.

== Background ==
The campaign led by General Bugeaud against Khalifa Ahmed ben Salem in the Tadmayt region in April 1844 aimed to caution the tribes that remained loyal to the state of Emir Abdelkader. General Bugeaud's forces set out from El-Harrach on April 27, 1844, comprising an army of approximately 6,000 to 8,000 soldiers after assembling the gathering since April 25, 1844. The objective was to curb the influence of Emir Abdelkader and maintain control over tribes in the region.

== Battle ==
After 18 days of marching towards Djurdjura, including clashes with Algerian resistance fighters, a portion of General Bugeaud's force was stationed in Tadmayt under the command of General Gentil, General Court, and Colonel Schmitt. The remaining forces continued advancing towards the mountains of Sidi Ali Bounab. General Bugeaud encountered resistance from the tribes and hamlets of Iflissen Umellil, leading to an attack by Ahmed ben Salem's horsemen. The Algerians withdrew towards the heights of Sidi Ali Bounab, and General Bugeaud eventually withdrew after losing 32 French soldiers. The Zawawa resistance also suffered significant losses, with some of their villages being burned and destroyed.

== Aftermath ==
Following the battle, the leader of the Iflissen Umellil confederation, known as "Ben Zaamoum," advanced towards the French camp to negotiate a truce with France. He secured recognition as the leader of his confederation by the French.
