= Battle Of Tizi Ouzou (1845) =

Battle between The Emirate Of Mascara and the French Army

- Part of French conquest of Algeria
Date	June 1845
Location	Boukhalfa, Algeria
Result	French victory

Belligerents
Emirate of Mascara	France

Commanders and leaders
Belqasem Oqasi; Ahmed bin Salem	Thomas Robert Bugeaud; Jean-François Gentil

Strength
Unknown	200 Calvalrymen

Casualties and losses
Some Casualties	Unknown

The Battle of Tizi Ouzou, also known as the Battle of Boukhalfa or the Battle of Rajaouna in June 1845, took place in the eastern outskirts of Algeria around the city of Tizi Ouzou.

== Background ==
General Jean-François Gentil participated in the battle against the tribes of Tizi Ouzou in June 1845 The former Agha, known as Belqasem Oqasi, alongside the Khalifa Ahmed ben Salem, endeavored in March 1845 to incite rebellion among the tribes surrounding the Sebaou Valley near Tizi Ouzou Their objective was to regain influence over the region. They promised the tribes the imminent arrival of Prince Abd al-Qadir following his remarkable victories in the western region of Algeria Some factions from Ait Irathen From Larbaa Nath Irathen, Ait Fraoussen From Mekla, and Ait Jnad, responded to the call of Belqasem Oqasi and Ahmed ben Salem. They rallied to expel the leaders appointed by France in the region.

However, the French occupation forces swiftly mobilized their collaborating troops at the onset of the rebellion, fortifying themselves in "Burj Tizi Ouzou" in the Rajaouna Mountains. They communicated the precarious situation to the Governor-General in Algiers General De Bar dispatched approximately 200 cavalry, overseen by the Commander of the Yser Region, to Tizi Ouzou to reinforce the appointed leaders and repel the tribal resistance's attack This support was followed by the arrival of another contingent of knights sent by the Commander of the Khachna Region, known as "The Arab General," to reinforce the defenders of Tizi Ouzou.

== Battle ==
The two forces, the tribal resistance on one side and the French collaborators on the other, clashed in the region of "Ouled Boukhelifa" (Boukhalfa) at the beginning of June 1845. There, Belqasem Oqasi and Ahmed ben Salem, along with the tribal resistors supporting them, suffered defeat, The resistance suffered some casualties, leading them to abandon Belqasem Oqasi and his successor, especially after discovering the camp of General Jean-François Gentil, who had arrived to support the French collaborators in Tizi Ouzou.

== Aftermath ==
After this, The leadership of France's allies in the Kabyle region was reinforced and it marked an extension of French influence in Kabylia.
