= Ahmed bin Salem =

Algerian Sufi commander (born c. 1802)

Ahmed bin Tayeb bin Salem
- أحمد بن الطيب بن سالم
- Born: Ahmed bin Al-Tayeb bin Salem Al-Debaisi around 1802; Aïn Bessem
- Died: after 1846
- Military career
- Allegiance: Emirate of Abdelkader
- Branch: Army of Abdelkader
- Service years: 1837–1847
- Rank: Khalifa
- Commands: Commander of the Jibal district
- Conflicts: French conquest of Algeria: Third Campaign against Abdelkader; Mitidja Campaign (1839); Battle Of Ammal (1840); Battle of Boudouaou; Battle of Beni Mered; Battle Of Tadmaït (1844); Battle of Dellys (1844); Battle Of Tizi Ouzou (1845); Nath Irathen campaign; Battle of Beni Jaad; Battle of Issers (1846)

Ahmed bin Tayeb bin Salem al-Debaisi, or simply Ahmed bin Salem, was an Algerian Sufi, commander, and district leader noted for organizing Kabyle resistance within the Emirate of Abdelkader.

== Origins ==
Ahmed bin Salem was born between 1798 and 1807 in Aïn Bessem, associated with the Beni Jaad milieu around the Dar-Es-Soltan of the Regency of Algiers; later sources connect his lineage to the Sufi tradition of Sidi Salem bin Makhlouf.

== Description ==
Contemporary notices describe Ahmed bin Salem as of average height (about 171 centimetres (5 ft 7 in)), with a black beard and eyes, fair complexion, religious and prudent in character, courageous, and skilled in horsemanship.

== Abdelkader's tours and appointment ==
After the Treaty of Tafna (1837), Emir Abdelkader expanded influence east by taking bay‘a from local tribes in Kabylia; during a tour in late 1837 he met Ahmed bin Salem, whose aptitude led to entrusted local leadership and subsequent appointment as district commander (khalifa) in the Jibal area of Bouïra and surroundings.

== The district's organization ==
Ahmed’s district was organized into four aghaliks under appointed aghas, integrating local command with the emirate’s administrative‑military structure.

== War against France ==
=== Mitidja Campaign (1839) ===
In 1839, alongside other commanders, Ahmed conducted strikes across the Mitidja plain against French columns and allied contingents; early successes were followed by setbacks that forced withdrawals, consistent with the Emirate’s mobile defense doctrine.

=== Battle of Ammal (1840) ===
Regrouping in the mountainous corridors of Khemis El-Khechna and Bani Omran, Ahmed harassed lines of movement and ambushed elements of General Sylvain Charles Valée’s forces near Ammal before disengaging.

=== Battle of Boudouaou (1840) ===
During French road‑building toward Kabylia, Ahmed massed men near Boudouaou; a rapid relief under Nicolas Changarnier broke the investment and captured materiel, though Ahmed evaded capture.

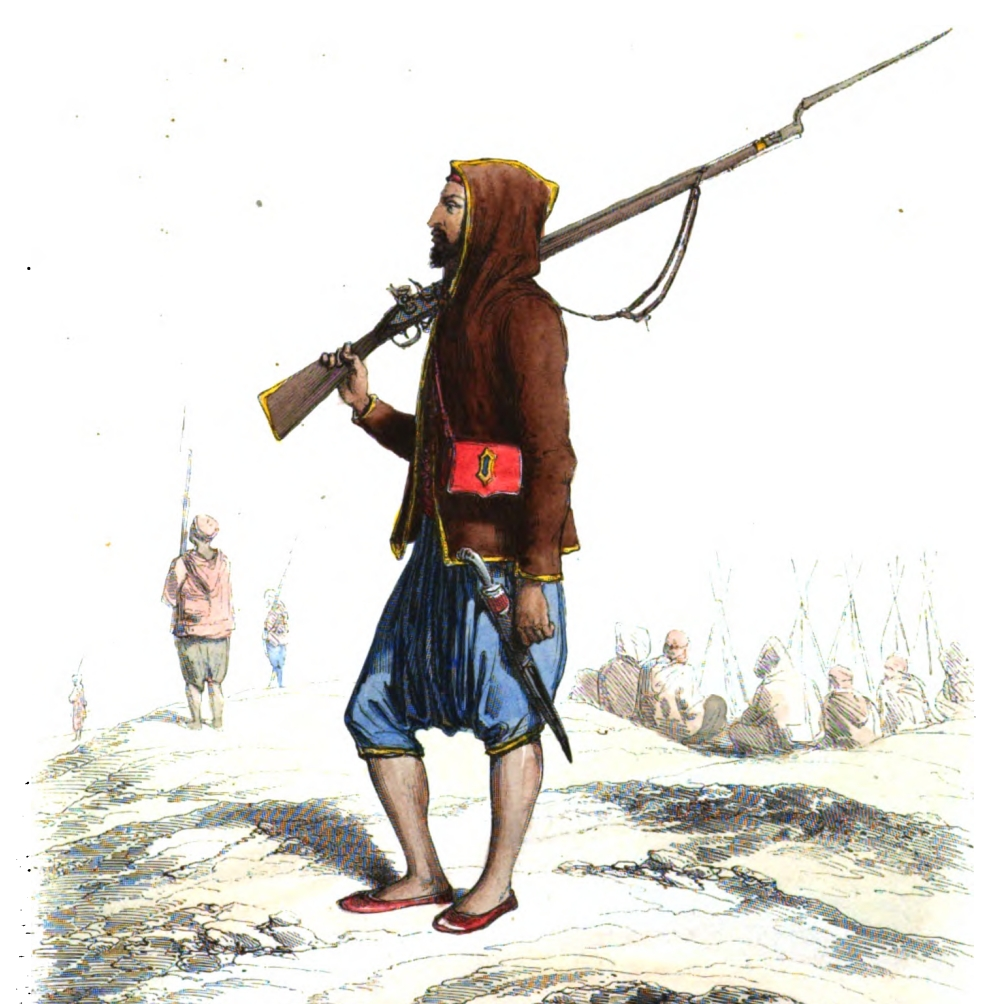
Algerian infantry

=== Battle of Beni Mered (1842) ===
In April 1842, a raiding force under Ahmed struck a detachment near Beni Mered between Blida and Boufarik, in proximity to a French reserve camp, in actions tied to the death of Sergent Blandan.

=== Battle of Tadmaït (1844) ===
In April 1844, General Thomas Robert Bugeaud mounted operations to curtail the emirate’s sway in the Tadmaït sector; after prolonged fighting the French withdrew with losses while Algerian casualties were also substantial.

=== Battle of Dellys (1844) ===
Operations around Dellys in 1844 brought Zwawa contingents under Ahmed bin Salem into contact with French coastal detachments as part of efforts to stretch French lines and disrupt movements along the coast.

=== Battle of Tizi Ouzou (1845) ===
French units advancing toward Tizi Ouzou faced blocking actions and raids by Kabyle forces under Ahmed bin Salem, reflecting the Emirate’s mobile defense and harassment tactics across the Djurdjura region.

=== Nath Irathen campaign (1845) ===
In 1845, Ahmed maneuvered through Aït Irathen country in a series of skirmishes and counter‑raids against French‑aligned contingents, complicating French advances into central Kabylia.

=== Battle of Beni Jaad (1845) ===
As khalifa of the district, Ahmed coordinated with Beni Jaad tribal leaders for local defense and reprisals during renewed clashes with French columns, indicative of the Emirate’s reliance on tribal mobilization.

=== Battle of Issers (1846) ===
Fighting along the Oued Isser corridor in 1846 pitted Ahmed’s horsemen against French columns moving east from the Mitidja, with raids and counter‑moves across the river approaches.
