= Col des Beni Aïcha (disambiguation) =

Col des Beni Aïcha may refer to:

- Col des Beni Aïcha, an old name of Thenia in Algeria.
- Battle of the Col des Beni Aïcha (1837), a battle in the French conquest of Algeria in 1837.
- Battle of the Col des Beni Aïcha (1846), a battle in the French conquest of Algeria in 1846.
- Battle of the Col des Beni Aïcha (1871), a battle in the Mokrani Revolt in 1871.
