= Jean-François Gentil =

French officer who participated to the French conquest of Algeria

- Born: Jean-François-Madeleine de Gentil; 8 March 1789; Artaise-le-Vivier, France
- Died: 29 March 1852 (aged 63); Paris, France
- Military career
- Allegiance: France
- Branch: French Army, Armée des Émigrés, Army of Condé
- Service years: 1808–1852
- Rank: Divisional general
- Conflicts: Peninsular War (1808); Siege of Astorga; French invasion of Russia (1812); German campaign of 1813; Battle of Dresden; Campaign in north-east France (1814); Hundred Days (1815); French conquest of Algeria (1830); Second Assault of Dellys (1844); Battle of the Col des Beni Aïcha (1846)
- Awards: Order of Saint Louis; Legion of Honour; Order of Leopold

Jean-François-Madeleine de Gentil (8 March 1789 – 29 March 1852) was a French officer who participated to the French conquest of Algeria.

== Family ==
Jean-François Gentil is the son of Louis-Français de Gentil who was squire and lord of Artaise-le-Vivier, and was a former officer in the 1st Infantry Regiment.

His mother is the named Alexisse-Edmée de Meaux d'Armonville whom his father married and from whom he had nine children.

His father emigrated to France during the year 1792 with three of his sons, including Jean-François Gentil, with whom he campaigned in the Armée des Émigrés.

== Military training ==
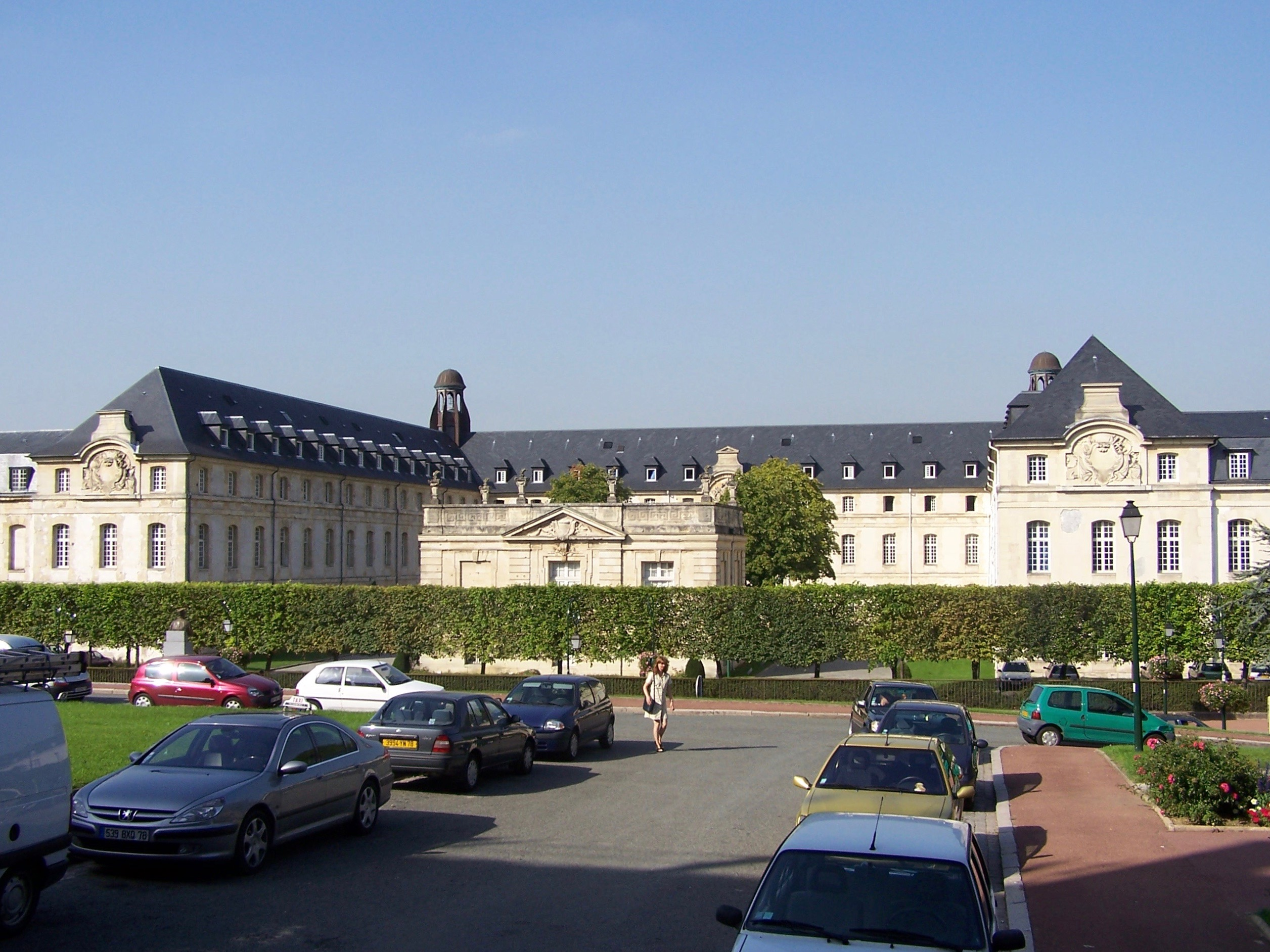
École spéciale militaire de Saint-Cyr

Jean-François Gentil was admitted to the École spéciale militaire de Saint-Cyr on 29 December 1808, from which he left on 27 July 1809 as a Sub-lieutenant in the "1er régiment de chasseurs-conscrits", which then became the "3e régiment de voltigeurs de la Garde impériale" of the "Jeune Garde".

== Military campaigns in Europe ==
=== Campaign and siege of Germany and Austria (1809) ===
As a sub-lieutenant in the "1er régiment de chasseurs-conscrits", he took part in the 1809 military campaign in Germany.

=== Campaign of Napoleon I in Spain (1810–1811) ===
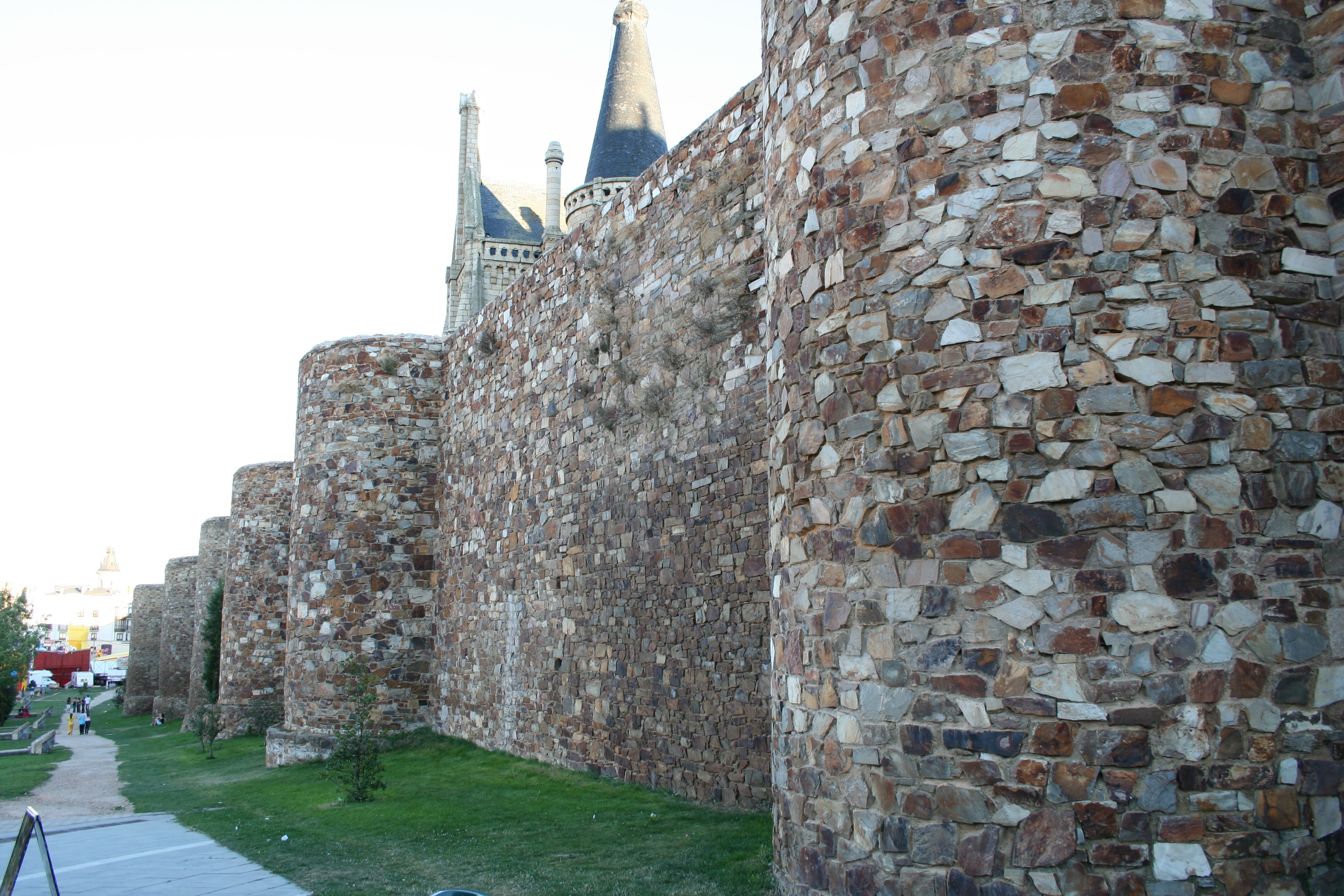
Stone walls of the city of Astorga

The sub-lieutenant that he was then in the same regiment also participated in the two military campaigns of 1810 and 1811 during the Peninsular War.

Thus, after his return from Prussia, Gentil then reinforced the army corps that roamed the Iberian Peninsula, and he distinguished himself at the Siege of Astorga in the Kingdom of León from 21 March 1810.

Gentil therefore took part in this siege that history considers one of the finest feats of arms of the Spanish Civil War.

== First military promotion ==
On 6 December 1811, he was appointed as a lieutenant officer in the "Régiment des flanqueurs-chasseurs" of the "Jeune garde".

On 15 December of the same year, he became lieutenant adjutant-major of the "1er régiment de voltigeurs" of the same weapon.

== French invasion of Russia (1812) ==
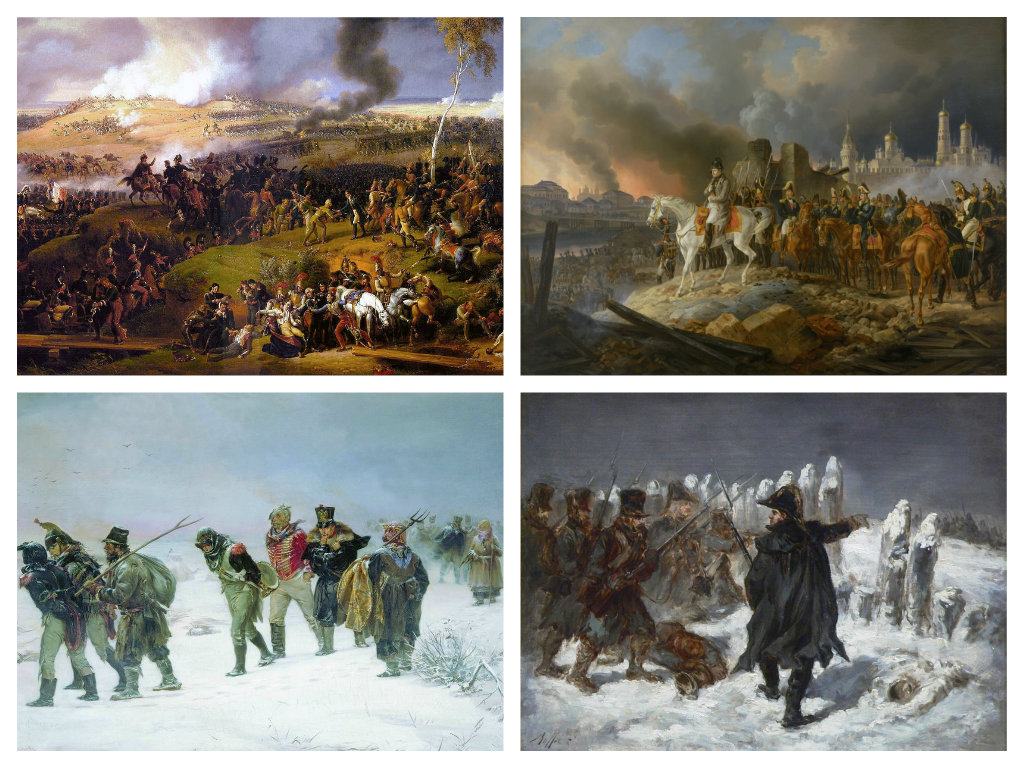
French invasion of Russia

Lieutenant Jean-François Gentil was part with the "1st regiment of voltigeurs" of the military campaign of 1812 in Russia.

His feet froze during the fighting, and he lost the big toe of his right foot and two phalanges of two other fingers.

== German campaign of 1813 ==
After being promoted to the rank of Adjutant Major on 8 April 1813, he then took part in the German campaign of 1813.

He distinguished himself by his bravery and his fight in the Battle of Dresden, where he was shot in the left arm.

As a reward for his heroic conduct on this day of 26 August 1813, he received as a gratuity the medal of the cross of the Legion of Honour.

== Campaign in north-east France (1814) ==
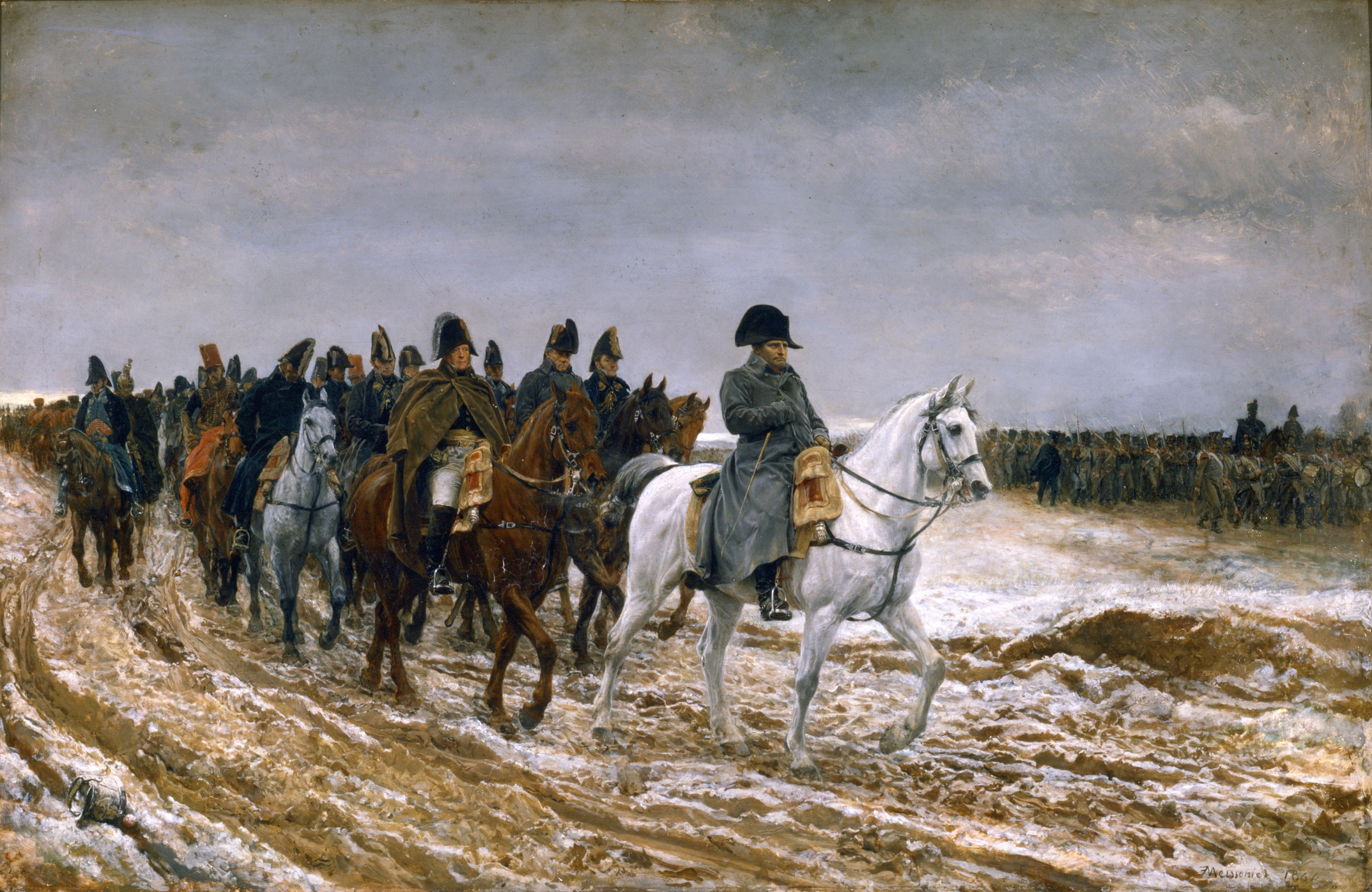
Campaign in north-east France (1814)

Captain Gentil actively participated in the French campaign led by the Sixth Coalition against the First French Empire, which took place from late December 1813 to April 1814.

While Napoleon was trying to stop the invasion of France and keep his throne, Captain Gentil was shot in the head in the Épinal affair dated 11 January 1814.

== Hundred Days (1815) ==
During the reorganization of the French Army, he was incorporated with his rank of captain in the 3rd line infantry regiment.

It was then that in the Hundred Days period during 1815, he passed to the 4th regiment of voltigeurs of the new and young imperial guard.

He actively participated with this regiment in the campaign of the Army of the North during the spring of 1815.

== First transitional phase (1815–1816) ==
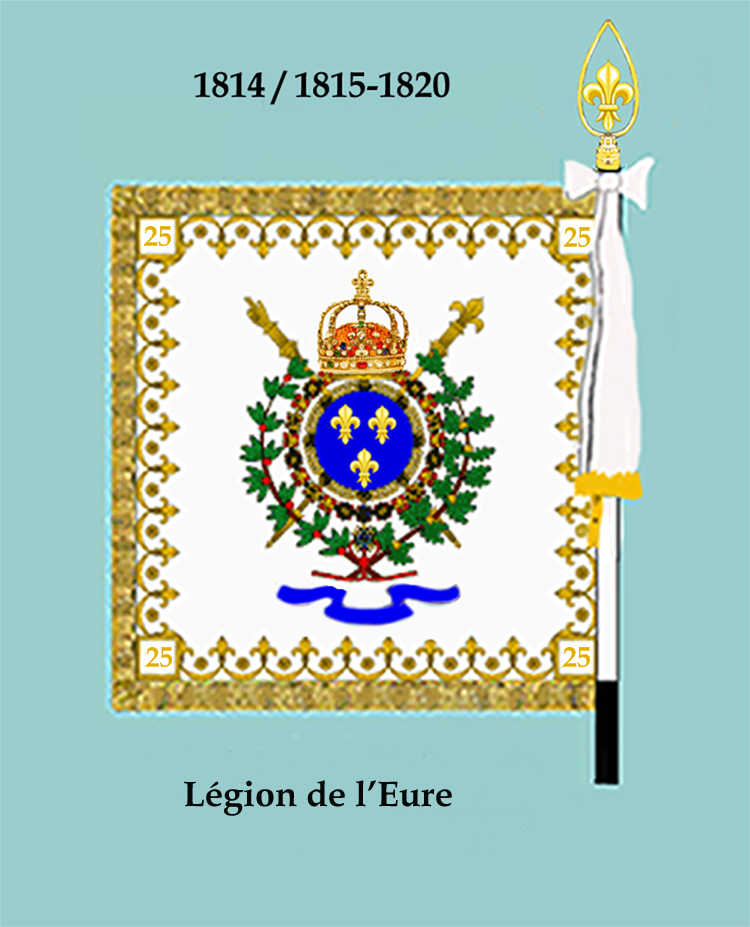
Flag of the Eure legion (1816-1820)

The captain Gentil was dismissed and put on non-working leave on 22 September 22, 1815 for a period of a whole year.

The following year when the departmental legions were created in France, Gentil was admitted as captain of the Eure legion on 20 November 1816.

== Garde royale (1819) ==
In 1819, Marshal Laurent de Gouvion Saint-Cyr wanted to modify the organization and the military spirit of the French royal guard.

He then appointed Captain Gentil with several former officers of the Empire to be incorporated into this corps.

This is how Gentil passed with his rank of captain in the 4th regiment of the royal guard.

== Second transitional phase (1828–1832) ==
Captain Gentil was included in the Royal Guard's dismissal list and was put on leave pay in 1828.

He was not recalled to military activity until 8 November 1832 when he was appointed as battalion commander in the 49th line infantry regiment.

== French conquest of Algeria (1832–1847) ==
Promoted to the rank of Maréchal de camp, General Gentil was appointed at the beginning of 1844 to command the military subdivision and the territory of Algiers in Mitidja.

This is how he took part in February 1846 in the expedition against the tribes of Khachna Massif within Kabylia and contributed powerfully to the success of the murderous fight of Ouarez-Eddin, which resulted in obtaining the submission of the Flissa tribe.

== Promotion to the rank of Major General (1848) ==
Jean-François Gentil was promoted to the rank of major general on 17 August 1848.

== Awards ==
Jean-François Gentil was decorated with several medals during his military career, including:

- Knight of the Order of Saint Louis.
- Officer of the Legion of Honour by decree dated 13 April 1846.
- Officer of the Order of Leopold by Belgian royal decree dated 10 July 1847.

== Death ==
General Gentil died in the city of Paris on 29 March 1852 at the age of 63 and was buried in one of his cemeteries.

The cause of his sudden death was due to the fact that he succumbed to an apoplexy in his family home.

== See also ==
- École spéciale militaire de Saint-Cyr
- Armée des Émigrés
- 1st Infantry Regiment
- Peninsular War
- Laurent de Gouvion Saint-Cyr
- French conquest of Algeria
- Thomas Robert Bugeaud
- Emir Abdelkader
- Emir Mustapha
- Ahmed bin Salem
- Louis Juchault de Lamoricière
- Aimable Pélissier
- Marie Alphonse Bedeau
- Nicolas Changarnier
- Louis-Eugène Cavaignac

== Bibliography ==
- Nicolas Viton de Saint Allais (1816). Nobiliare universel de France, Volume 8. Paris: Saint Allais, Libraire. p. 194.
- Le moniteur de l'armée: 1852. Paris: Librairie Militaire. 1852. p. 2.
- Narcisse Faucon (1890). Le livre d'or de l'Algérie. Paris: Augustin Challamel, Éditeur. pp. 602–605.
