= Battle of Ammal =

1840 battle in Algeria

- Part of French conquest of Algeria
Date	18–19 April 1840
Location	Ammal, Algeria 36.61888°N 3.65665°E
Result	Algerian victory

Belligerents
Emirate of Mascara	France

Commanders and leaders
Ahmed bin Salem	(France) Sylvain Charles Valée (France) Villeneuve †

Strength
Unknown	4,000

Casualties and losses
Unknown	Heavy

The Battle of Ammal happened in 1840, between the Kabyle resistance of Abdelkader against France.

== Background ==
Following the retreat from Mitidja, Ahmed bin Salem made the strategic decision to fortify the mountains of Khemis El-Khechna and Bani Omran. This move aimed to closely monitor French movements in the region and launch raids against French troops and settlers, Choosing Jebel Zrawla as a vantage point for monitoring French colonial sites south of the Raghaya region, Ahmed ben Salem obstructed the French military patrols. However, each time, artillery fire dispersed the Algerian horsemen and soldiers, resulting in the loss of their horses Simultaneously, the French initiated attacks on a tribe near Ammal seizing 1,000 cattle and 300 sheep, The French army convoy was led from the areas of Khemis El-Khechna (El-Fenek) and "Ouled Hadj" (Qara Mustafa) near Wadi Qadara. Approximately 4,000 French soldiers, accompanied by four mountain cannons, were assembled before advancing towards the Amal Mountains.

== Battle ==
The campaign against the Ammal Mountains was a retaliatory move by Marshal Vallée. Ahmed ben Salem had directed his allies in Ammal to penetrate Metija, seizing cattle from French settlers in early April 1840, Responding promptly, Ahmed ben Salem came to the aid of the Ammal tribes, launching an attack on Marshal Vallée's forces on April 19, 1840. In this engagement, he managed to kill some French soldiers in the rear.

== Aftermath ==
Chief of Staff "Villeneuve" fell, succumbing to his severe injuries during the battle.
