= Bedeau =

- Language: French

Origin
- Origin: bedeau
- Meaning: beadle, sergeant of justice
- Region of origin: France

Bedeau is a French Huguenot surname. It is derived from the French word bedeau, meaning 'beadle', a sergeant of justice. Notable people with the surname include:

- Fitzroy Bedeau (born 1944), Grenadian politician
- Jacob Bedeau (born 1999), English-Grenadian footballer
- Marie Alphonse Bedeau (1804–1863), French general
- Tony Bedeau (1979–2025), English-Grenadian footballer
