= Marie Alphonse Bedeau =

French general and minister (1804-1863)

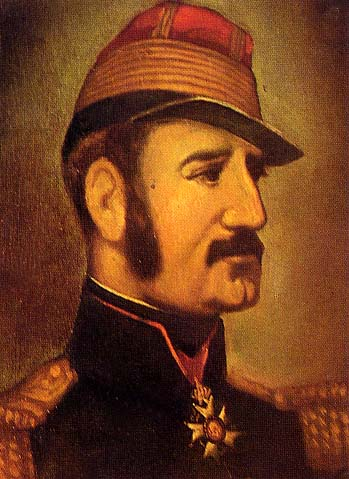
General Bedeau

Marie Alphonse Bedeau (19 August 1804 – 29 October 1863) was a French general and minister.

== Life ==
Bedeau was born on 19 August 1804 in Vertou (Lower Loire). He studied at the military school of Saint-Cyr, from the age of 16, 29 October 1820, until 1 October 1822, as lieutenant-student, school of enforcement staff. He served in the 8th Cuirassiers in and the Lancers of the Royal Guard. On 1 October 1828 he was promoted to lieutenant adjutant of the 2nd regiment of mounted artillery, and captain in the 5th light on 12 July 1831.

He was seconded to General Ferrier, where he became the adjutant. Attached to Gerard and Schramm, he was under their command, during the Belgian campaign of 1831 and 1832. During the Belgian campaign, he received the Croix de Guerre on 16 January 1833.

With the reorganization of the army in 1836, he was appointed battalion commander of the Foreign Legion, training in Pau. Lieutenant-Colonel of the 17th Light, on 11 November 1837, he fought in Algeria during several expeditions. He was at Setif on 16 and 17 October 1838 and in May 1839.

He was promoted on 4 December 1839 to the rank of colonel in the 17th light. He was wounded twice at Cherchell. On 2 May 1840, the famous passage cervical Mouzaïa, he is responsible for repelling the attacks of the enemy in the rear of the army and resisted the troops of Abd-el-Kader in the marabout Sidi Moussa. He noted also in the supplies of Miliana. On 27 May 1841 the Colonel was appointed brigadier and made available to the Governor General of Algeria, which supported operating on the border of Morocco.

In 1844 he took part in the Battle of Isly, after which he was appointed lieutenant general and commander in chief of the province of Constantine, Algeria. He made two campaigns in spring and autumn of 1845 with General Jean-François Gentil, and stands in 1847 in the expedition against the Kabyle of Bougie. On 10 July he was appointed Acting Governor-General and replaced by the Duke of Aumale.

He was in Paris in February 1848. On the 24th, at the head of the troops, he patrolled the streets of Paris, trying to restore order. The first regiments who marched along the boulevards, the butt in the air in front of the popular uprising, are guided by it. He commanded the Orleans chasseurs at the time of the attack on the station at Gabrielle. After his conduct on this occasion, he was being proposed as minister of war of the new regime. He declined the offer, but accepted the position of military governor of Paris and the term representing the Lower Loire to the Constituent Assembly, he became vice president. He was appointed representative of the Seine to the Legislature.

Wounded in fighting the insurgency in June, he was a member of the right in the Legislature. Hostile to the coup of 2 December 1851, he was arrested on the night of 2 December by Marshal St. Arnaud and imprisoned at Ham. He retired on 5 August 1852 to Belgium, where he lived until the amnesty of 1859.

Bedeau was a Grand Officer of the Legion of Honor. He died on 29 October 1863 in Nantes.

In 1883 the village Bedeau was named in his honor. It is located near Saida in the department of Oran, Algeria.

Political offices
Preceded by Camille Alphonse Trézel	French minister of War; 24 February 1848 – 25 February 1848	Succeeded by Jacques Gervais, baron Subervie
