= Sergent Blandan =

Jean Pierre Hippolyte Blandan
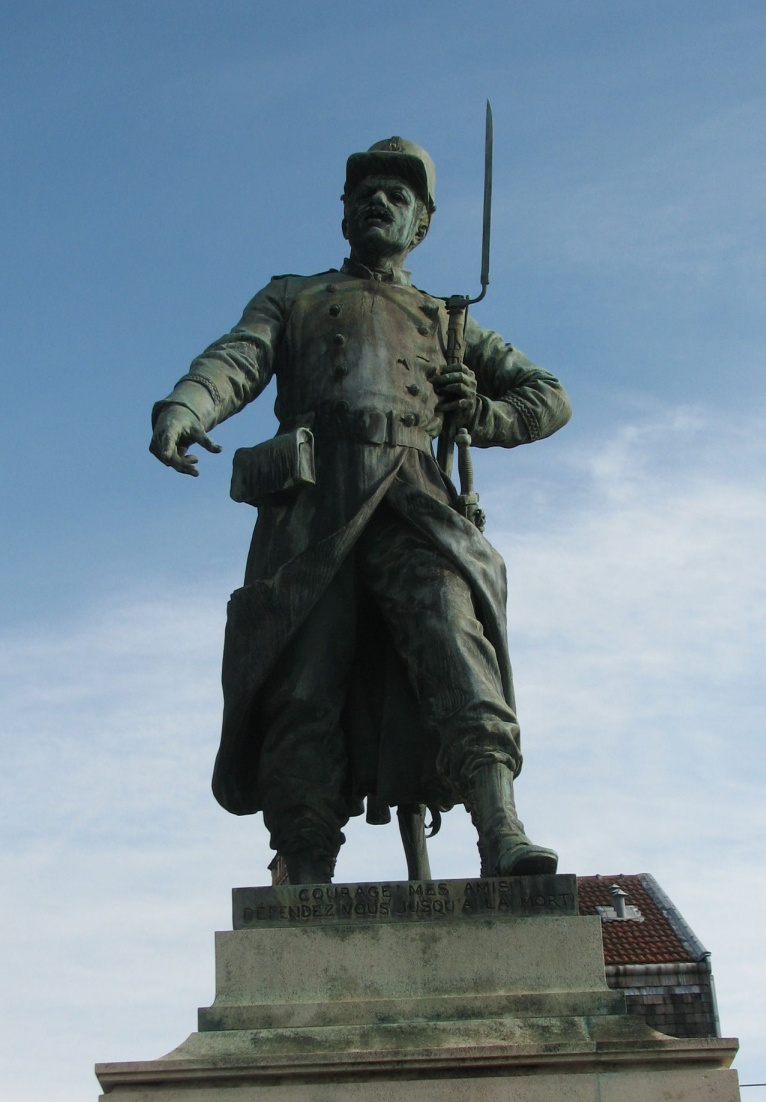
- Born: 9 February 1819; Lyon, France
- Died: 12 April 1842 (aged 23); Boufarik, French Algeria
- Military career
- Allegiance: France
- Service years: 1837-1842
- Rank: Sergeant
- Unit: 26th Infantry Regiment
- Awards: National Order of the Legion of Honour

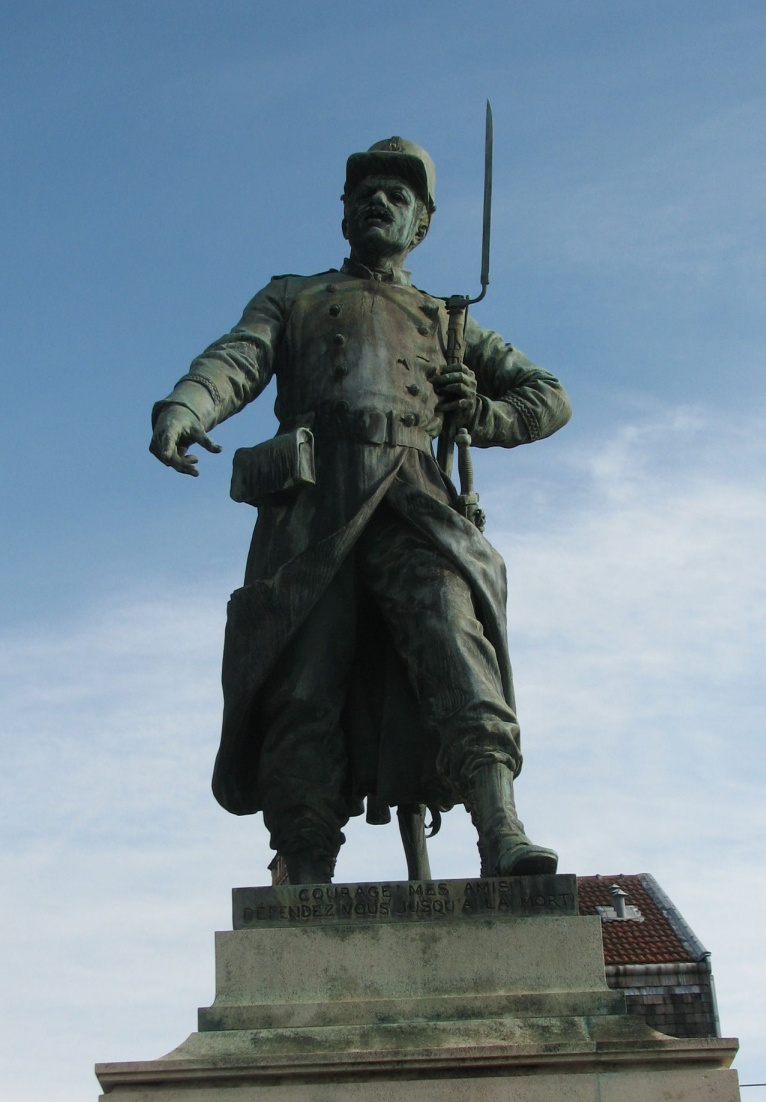
Sergent Blandan by Charles Gauthier, c.1886–87. Rue Sergent Blandan, Nancy.

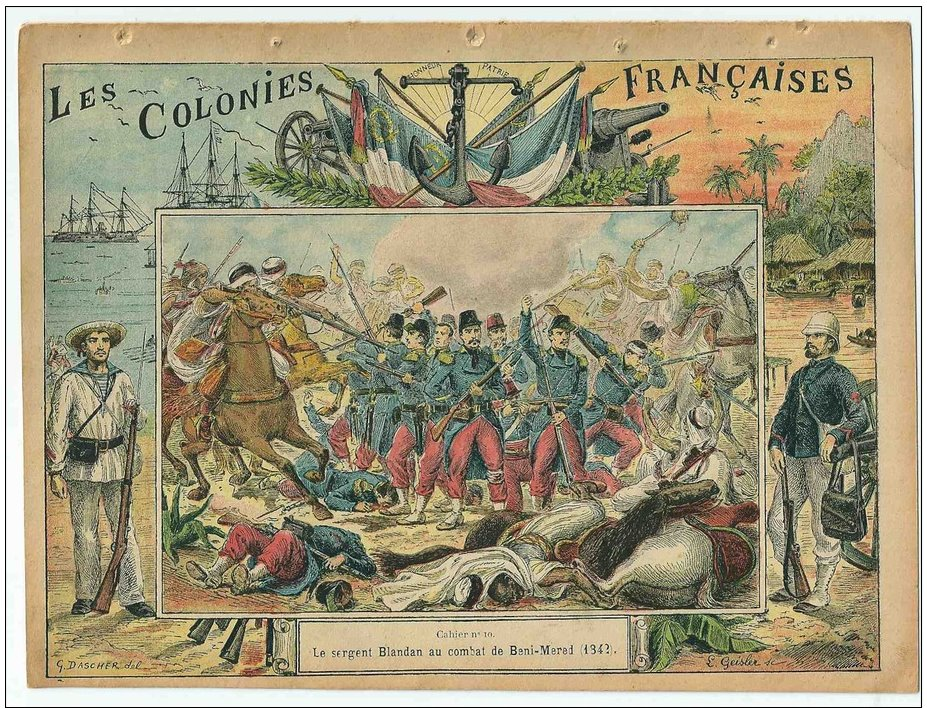
An 1894 illustration of Blandan's death

Jean Pierre Hippolyte Blandan (French pronunciation: [ʒɑ̃ pjɛʁ ipɔlit blɑ̃dɑ̃]; 9 February 1819 – 12 April 1842) was a French soldier, known for his historic resistance on the battlefield at Boufarik in Algeria. He was posthumously made a Chevalier of the Legion of Honour.

== Career ==
Blandan joined the French Army at the age of eighteen, and served in the conquest of Algeria. He left Lyon on 9 September 1837 for the city of Bône in the province of Constantine in Algeria to fight the tribe led by Oued Radjett. He was appointed Corporal on 6 August 1839, and promoted to Sergent on 1 January 1842.

== Death ==
On 11 April 1842, Blandan led a detachment of twenty men to carry mail from Boufarik to Béni Mered, some 8–9 km away. After about an hour of marching, his company was attacked by a group of 200–300 Arab horsemen. Blandan exhorted his men to fight, even though he was seriously wounded. He refused to surrender before the superior force, and cried "Courage mes amis, défendez-vous jusqu'à la mort!" (Be brave my friends, fight to the death!) The noise of the battle was heard in Boufarik and relief arrived under Joseph de Breteuil. They found only five soldiers still fighting, the others all being dead or wounded. Blandan died of his wounds that night in the hospital in Boufarik, at the age of 23.

== Tributes ==
In 1886, a public competition was run to create a statue of Blandan as a tribute to his heroism. The jury awarded the work to French sculptor Charles Gauthier who completed it in 1887 and the statue was placed in Boufarik following Algerian independence. However, it was moved to France in 1963, where it was placed in the courtyard of a barracks in Nancy. As part of the ceremony to mark the placement of the statue, Blandan's ashes were placed in the new monument's base. In 1990, it was moved again to Rue du Sergent Blandan, Nancy.

The statue represents Sergent Blandan, pointing at the battle of Boufarik where he died. He holds a weapon, to show that he was a military man.

In 1887, la rue Saint-Marcel, one of the oldest streets in Lyon, was renamed Rue du Sergent Blandan in his honour. Medals were struck in his name and a statue was placed on the Place Sathonay in Lyon.

The creation of Parc du Sergent Blandan in the 3rd, 7th and 8th arrondissements of Lyon was due to start in 2012. It will cover 17 hectares.

His death was depicted by Louis-Théodore Devilly in 1882. Presented at the Salon des artistes français in 1882, the painting was purchased by the State, which donated it to the Museum of Fine Arts in Nancy, of which Devilly was the curator.

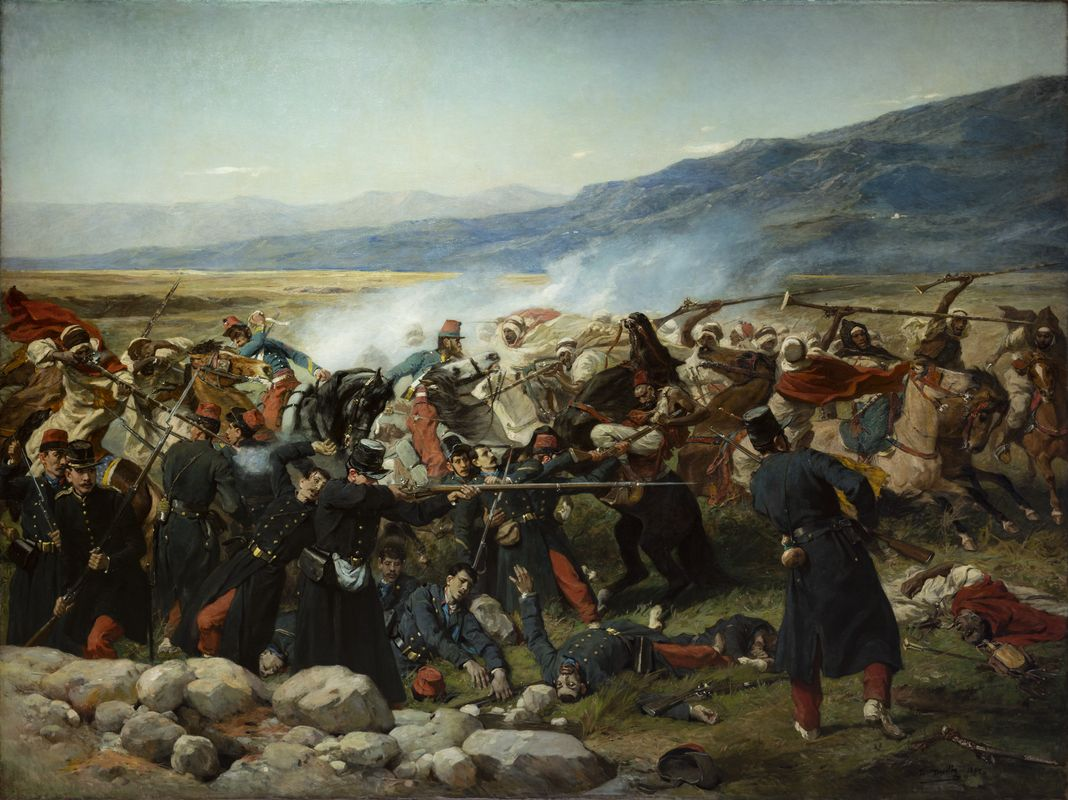
La Mort du sergent Blandan by Louis-Théodore Devilly
