= Bureaux arabes =

Section of colonial France's military

The Arab Bureaux (French: bureaux arabes, Arabic: المكاتب العربية) was a special section of colonial France's military in Algeria that was created in 1833 and effectively authorized by a ministerial order on 1 February 1844. It was staffed by French Orientalists, ethnographers and intelligence officers who specialized in indigenous affairs in an effort to help administer the new colony.

The Arab Bureaux had a significant influence on the formulation of French policy, driven by colonial beliefs of being part of a civilizing mission where offers saw themselves as an elite bringing modernity to Muslim Algerians and their society. Being well embedded with the locals, the bureaus also served as an intelligence collection operation for the army. Described by Ramzi Rouighi as the "public face of the military pacification of the natives", the Arab Bureaux subjected Algerians to "a constant regime of both euphemised and overt violence ... which endured for a century thereafter", as James McDougall writes in A History of Algeria (2017).

Eugène Daumas was a notable officer who served in the Bureaux arabes in the 1830s. He was promoted to the rank of general, and was made director of Algerian affairs in the Ministry of War after April 1850. His fluency in Arabic gave him great influence over France's initial administrations in Algeria.

These bureaux were dismantled after the fall of the Empire in 1870 and the triumph of the aggressive settlement policies favored by the colons and their Third Republic supporters.

== See also ==
- Specialized Administrative Sections
