= Eugène Daumas =

French general and writer (1803–1871)

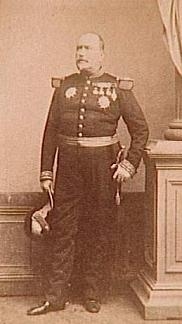
- Born: Melchior Joseph Eugène Daumas; 4 October 1803; Delémont, Switzerland
- Died: May 1871 (aged 67); Camblanes, France
- Military career
- Allegiance: France
- Branch: French Army
- Rank: Divisional general

Melchior Joseph Eugène Daumas (4 October 1803 - May 1871) was a French general and writer.

== Biography ==
Eugène Daumas entered the army in 1822. He became an officer in 1827 and went on to the cavalry school in Saumur. In 1835 he was posted to Algeria, which Charles X had invaded in 1830. But the new colony proved difficult to subdue. Under the orders of Marshal Bertrand Clausel, Daumas took part in the campaigns in of Mascara and Tlemcen. While in Algeria, Daumas learned the Arab language and became one of the French army's best experts on the Arab culture in North Africa. Tribesmen came to respect him for his skills on horseback.

Between 1837 and 1839, Daumas resided in Mascara as consul and personally got to know Abd El-Kader, the Emir of Mascara, who once called Daumas his "friend" in a letter. General Christophe Juchault de Lamoricière, upon becoming commander-in-chief of the restive colony for a short period, created the affaires arabes, the Arab affairs department, and put Daumas in charge of the province of Oran. When Thomas Robert Bugeaud became governor general of Algeria in 1840, he reinstated the bureaux arabes, the main instrument to administer cooperative tribes during the insurgency, on 17 August 1841. The same day Daumas was named the head of the colony's entire Arab affairs program. One of his explicit tasks was to gather intelligence about potential unrest.

In April 1850 he became director of Algerian affairs in the Ministry of War in Paris. On 14 January 1853 he was promoted to divisional general. On 12 August 1857 he was named a Senator.

Several of Daumas' works were translated into English in the 19th century. His book on horses was particularly appreciated among contemporaries.

== Major works ==
- Le Sahara algérien études géographiques et historiques sur la région au sud des établissements français en Algérie, Paris, Langlois et Leclercq, 1845
- La Grande Kabylie, Paris, Hachette, 1847
- Le Grand désert ou itinéraire d'une caravane du Sahara au pays des nègres, Paris, Chaix et Cie, 1848
- Les Chevaux du Sahara et les mœurs du désert, Paris, Lévy, 1851
- Moeurs et coutumes de l'Algérie, Paris, Hachette, 1853
- La Vie arabe et la société musulmane , Paris, Lévy, 1869
