= Artaise-le-Vivier =

- Commune
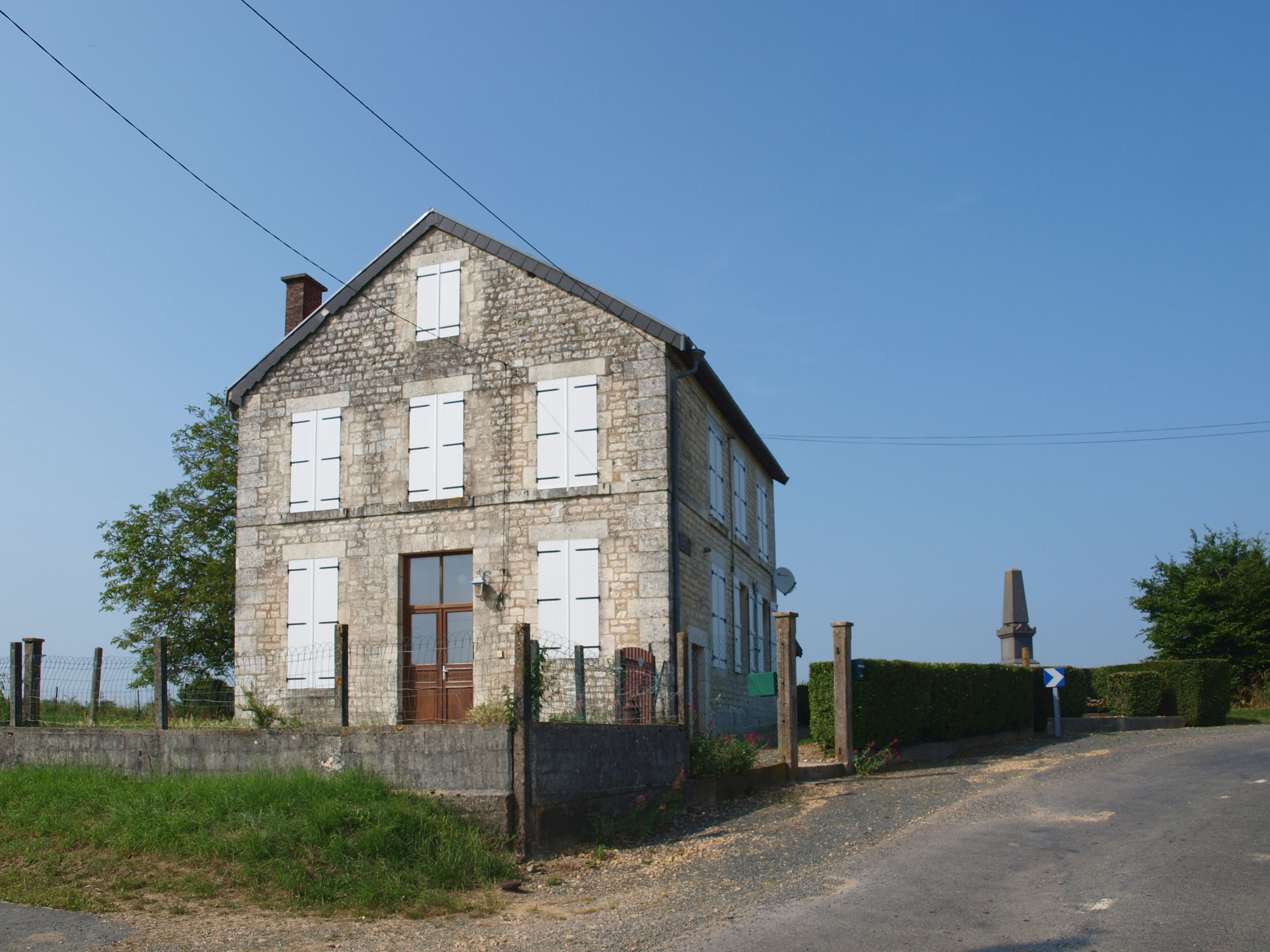
- Town Hall

- Coat of arms
- Location of Artaise-le-Vivier
- Location within France Location within Grand Est
- Coordinates: 49°34′03″N 4°53′27″E
- Country: France
- Region: Grand Est
- Department: Ardennes
- Arrondissement: Sedan
- Canton: Vouziers
- Intercommunality: CC Portes Luxembourg

Government
  - Mayor (2020–2026): Fabien Warzée
- Area^{1}: 8.47 km^{2} (3.27 sq mi)
- Elevation: 205 m (673 ft)
- Population (2023): 64
  - Density: 7.6/km^{2} (20/sq mi)
- Time zone: UTC+01:00 (CET)
  - Summer (DST): UTC+02:00 (CEST)
- INSEE/Postal code: 08023 /08390
- ^{1} French Land Register data, which excludes lakes, ponds, glaciers > 1 km^{2} (0.386 sq mi or 247 acres) and river estuaries.

Artaise-le-Vivier (French pronunciation: [aʁtɛz lə vivje]) is a commune in the Ardennes department in the Ardennes region of northern France.

== Geography ==
Artaise-le-Vivier is located some 25 km south-east of Charleville-Mézières and 15 km south by south-west of Sedan. Access to the commune is by the D24 road from Chémery-sur-Bar in the north-west passing through the commune and the village and continuing to join the D30 south-east of the commune. The D324 road also comes by an indirect route from La Neuville-à-Maire in the west to the village. The southern quarter of the commune is forested with the rest farmland.

The Ruisseau de Terron with its tributaries rises in the south of the commune and flows north-west forming part of the western border before continuing north-west to join the Bar near Malmy. The Ruisseau de Charlier forms part of the eastern border of the commune before flowing west through the centre to join the Ruisseau de Terron on the western border.

=== Heraldry ===
Arms of Artaise-le-Vivier	Blazon: Azure, two sceptres of Or saltirewise between in chief a crosslet the same, between in base an inescutcheon Gules, 3 fesses of Or.

== Administration ==
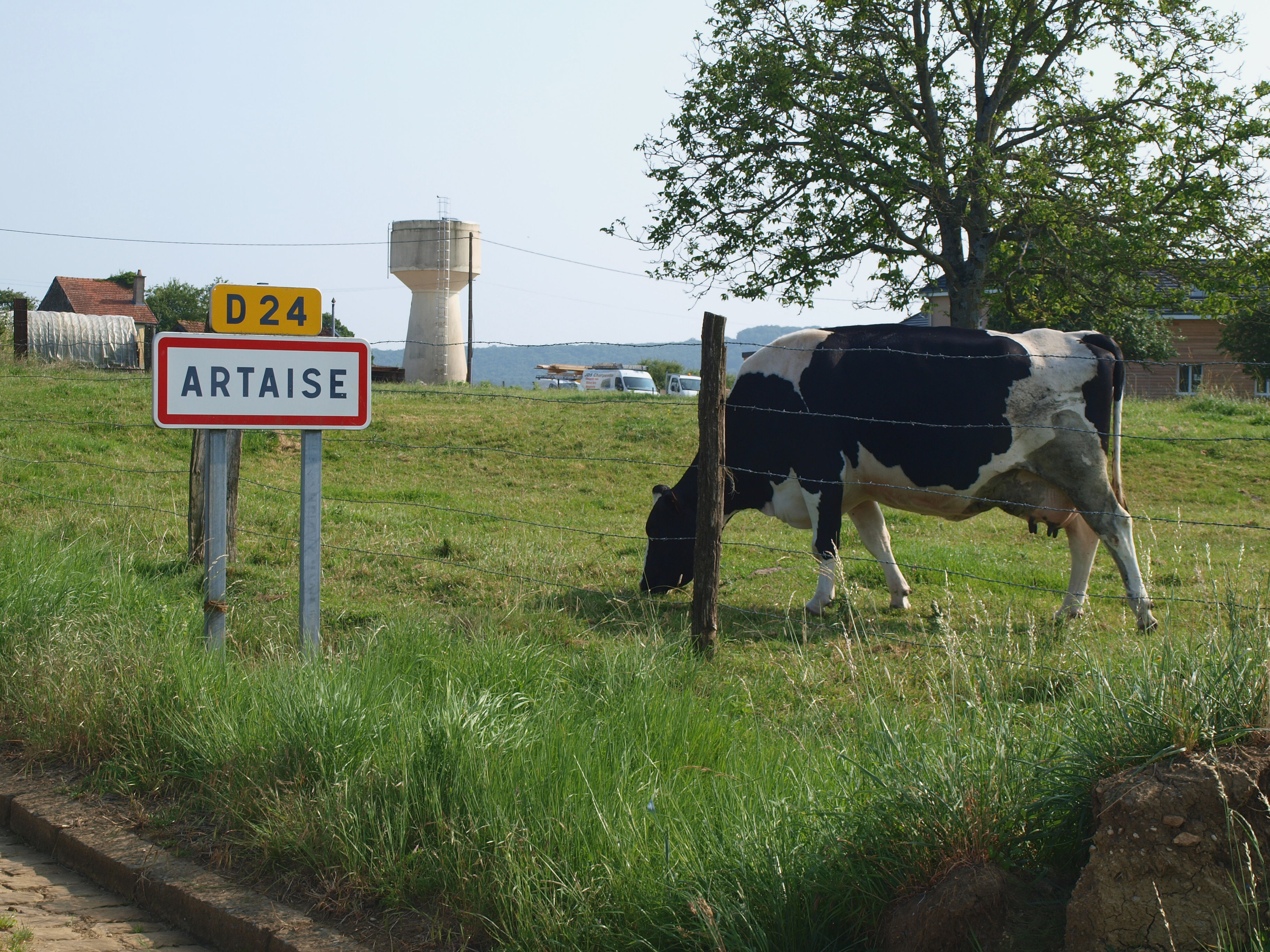
Entry to the village

List of Successive Mayors

From	To	Name
2001	2008	Claude Singlit
2008	2014	Thierry Warzée
2014	current	Fabien Warzée

== Demography ==
Historical population

Year	Pop.	±% p.a.
1793	265	—
1821	352	+1.02%
1846	391	+0.42%
1872	388	−0.03%
1901	226	−1.85%
1921	152	−1.96%
1946	71	−3.00%
1962	87	+1.28%
1968	85	−0.39%

Year	Pop.	±% p.a.
1975	72	−2.34%
1982	68	−0.81%
1990	49	−4.01%
1999	55	+1.29%
2007	62	+1.51%
2012	59	−0.99%
2017	66	+2.27%
2023	64	−0.51%

Source: EHESS and INSEE

== Sites and monuments ==
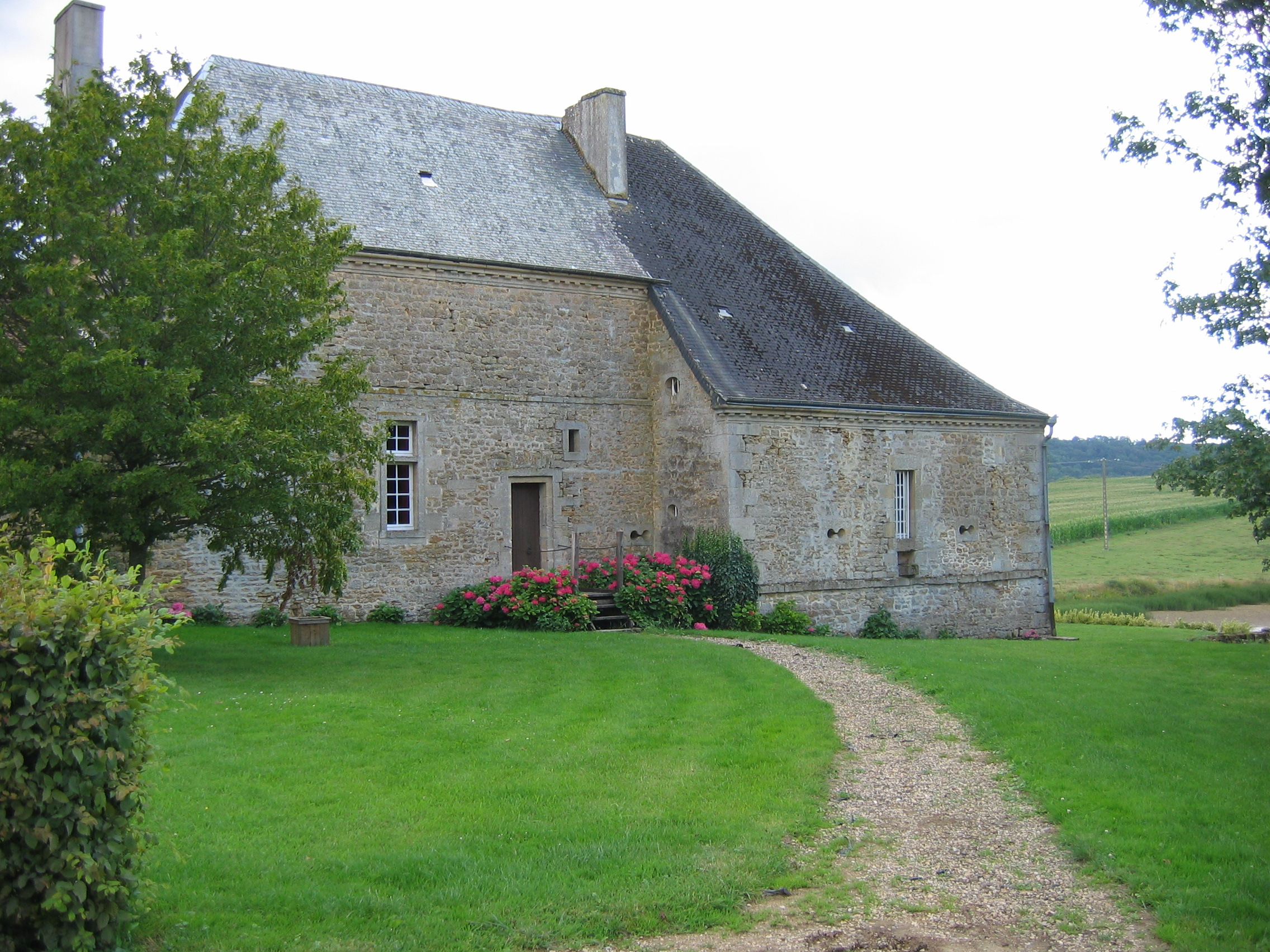
The fortified house of Raminoise

- The Church of Saint-Georges contains a Statue of Saint Georges (18th century) which is registered as an historical object.
- The Raminoise fortified house

== Picture Gallery ==
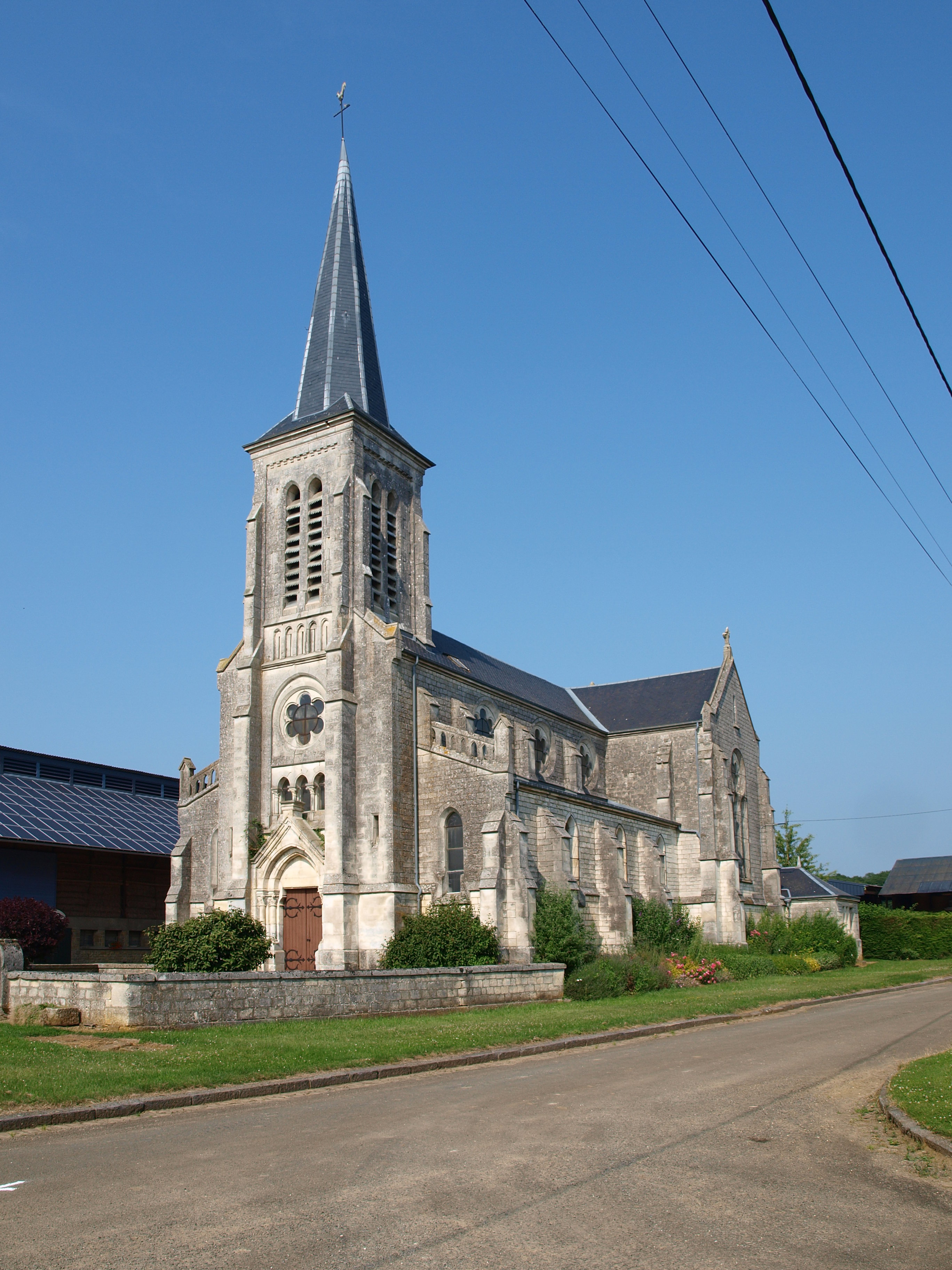
The church

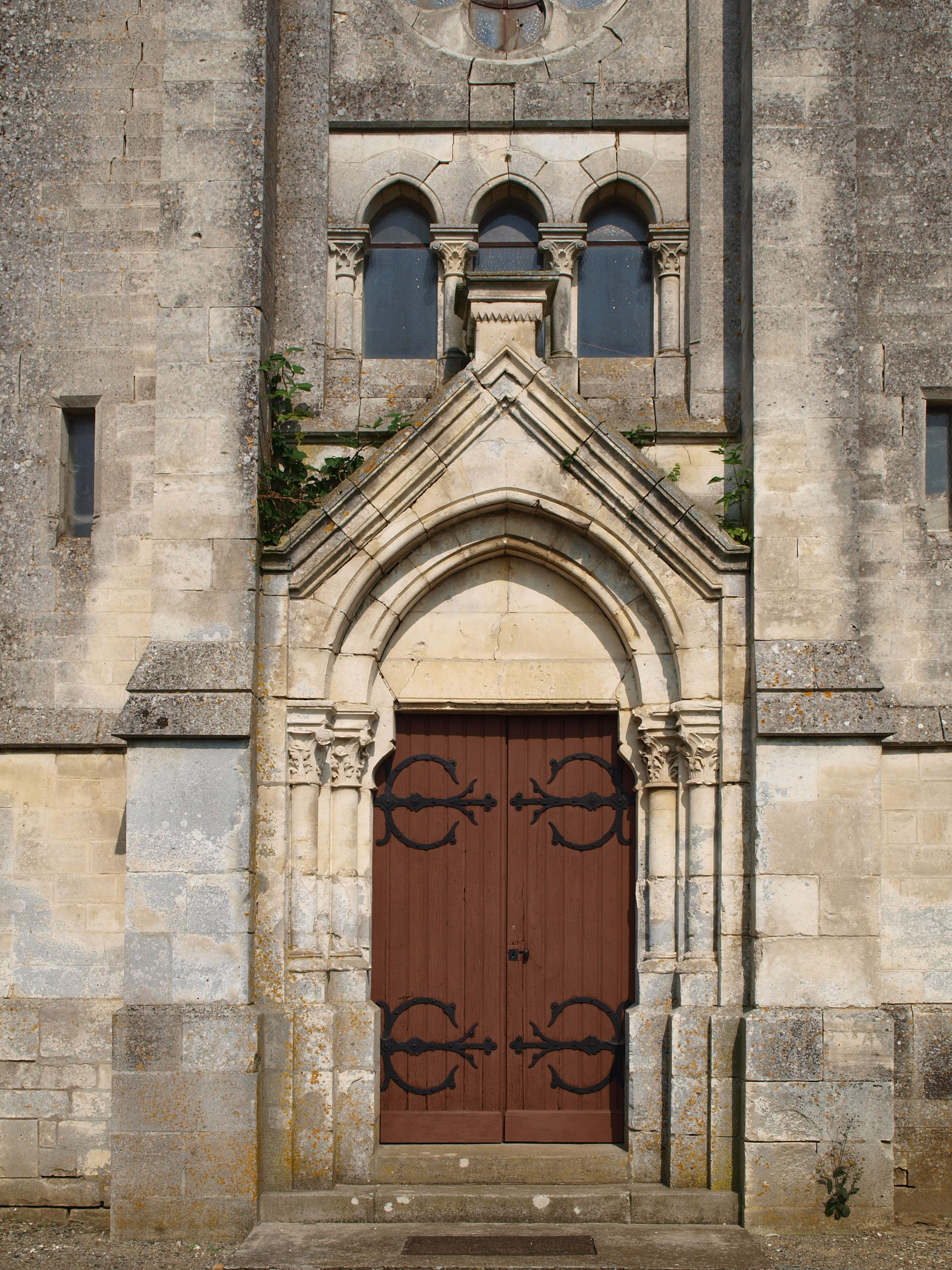
Entrance to the church

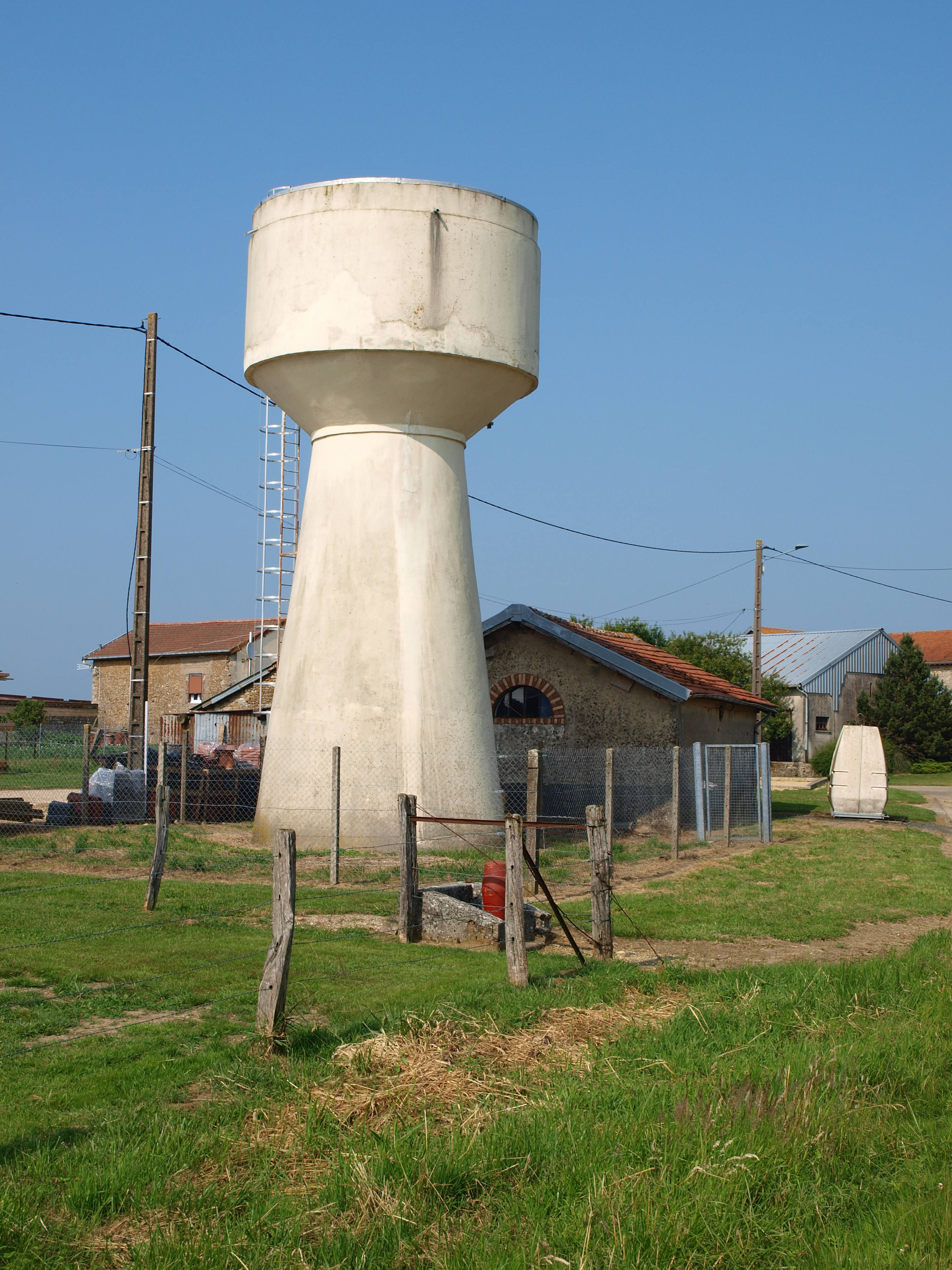
Artaise water tower

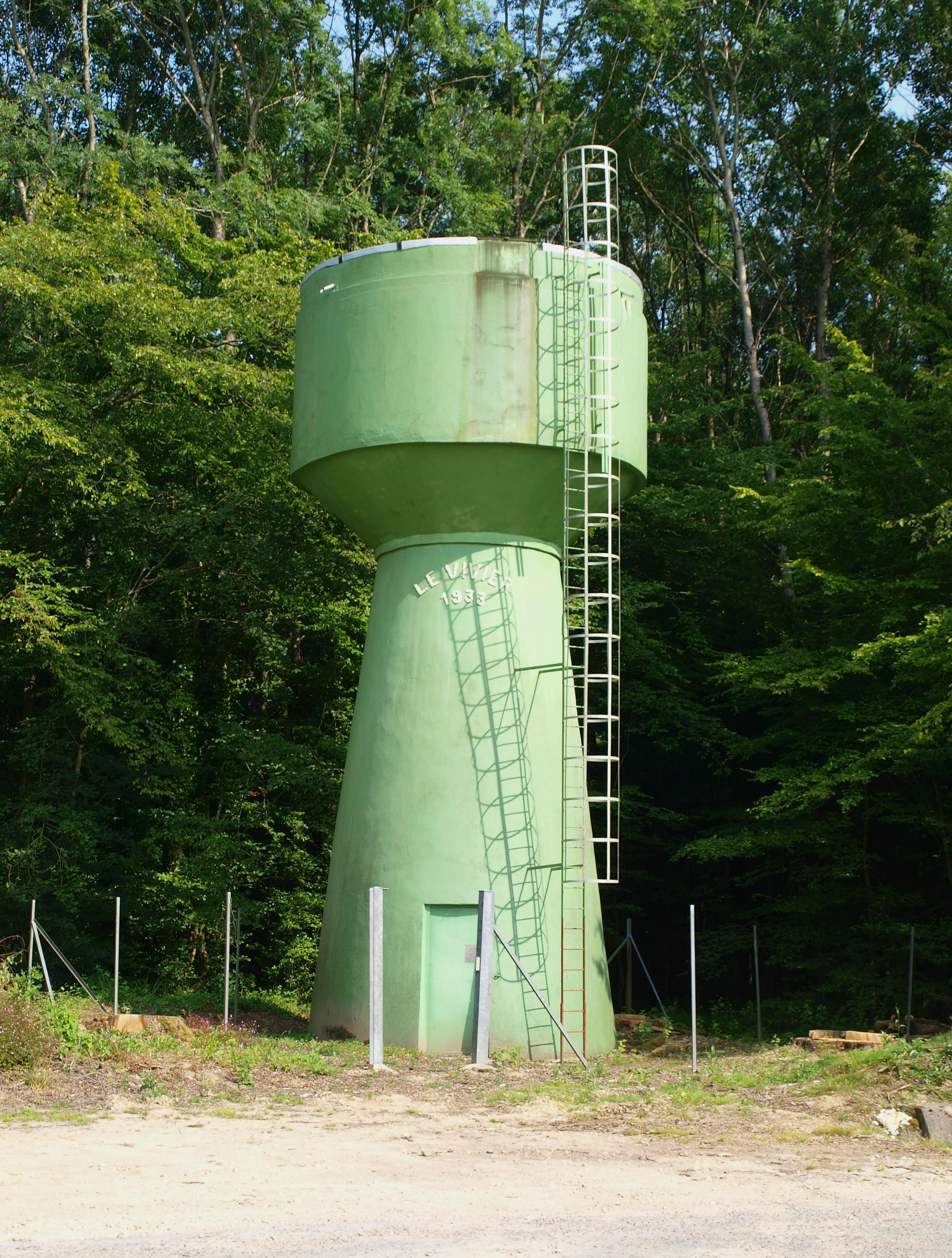
Le Vivier water tower

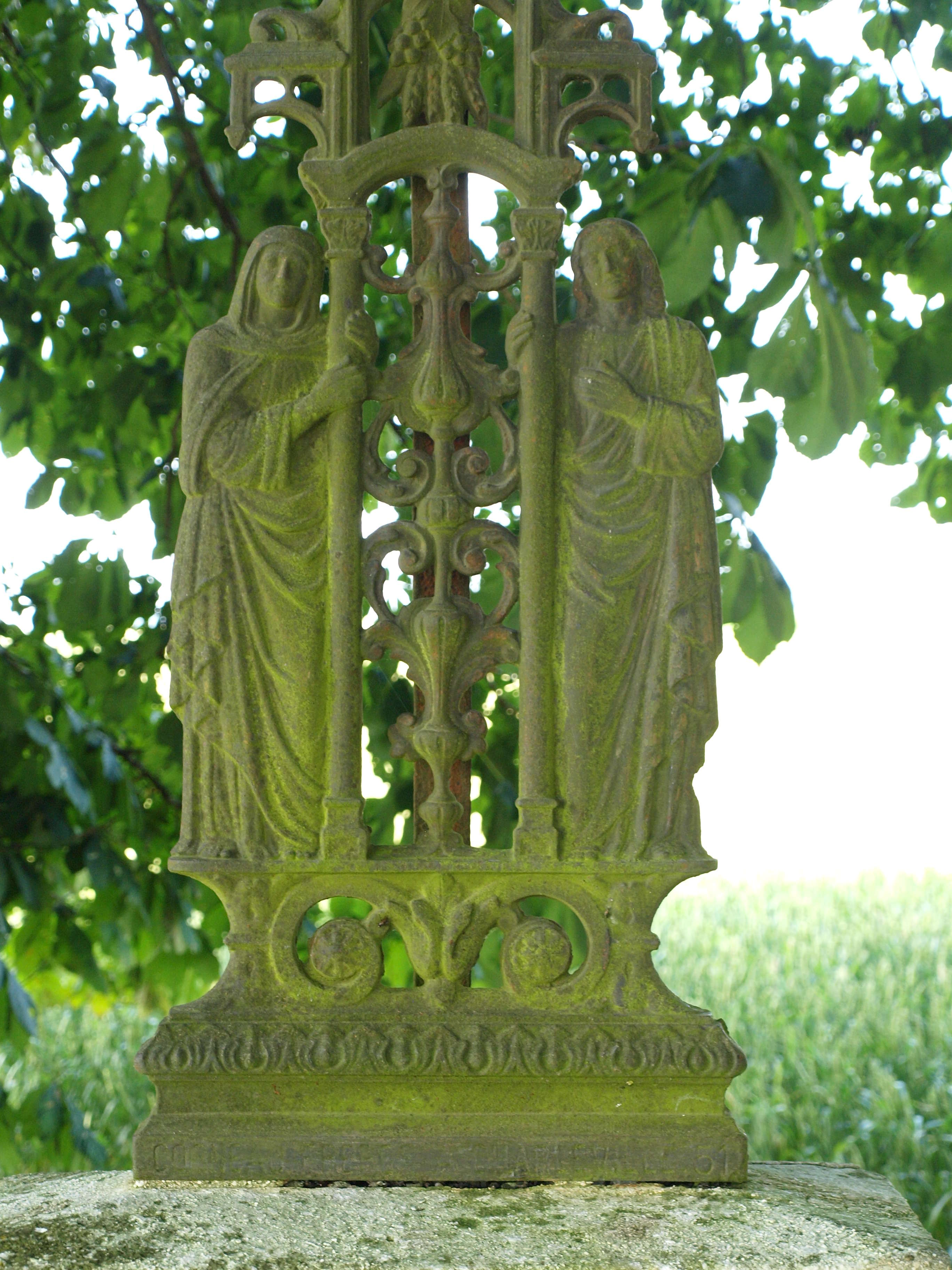
The calvary

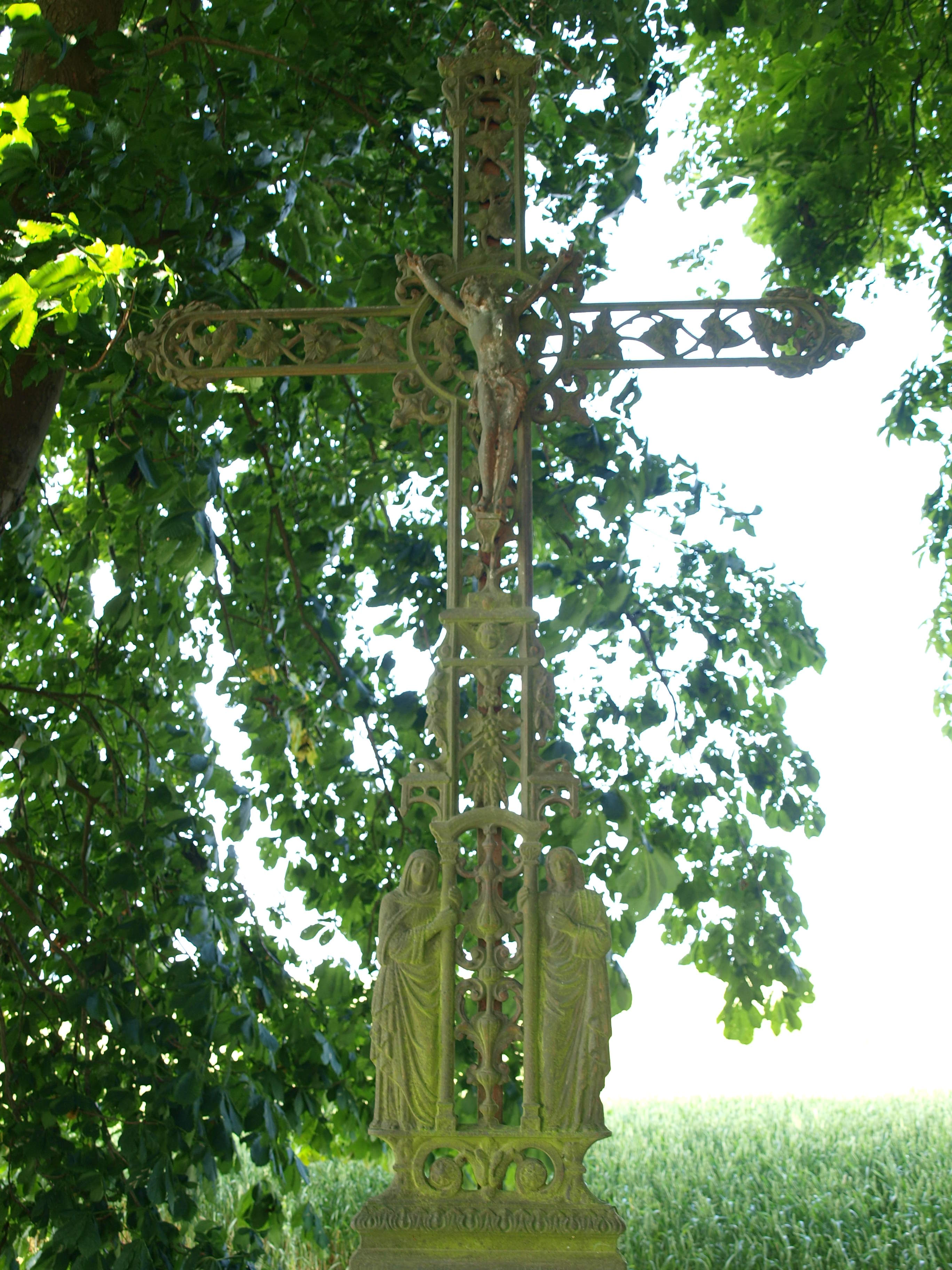
Wayside Cross

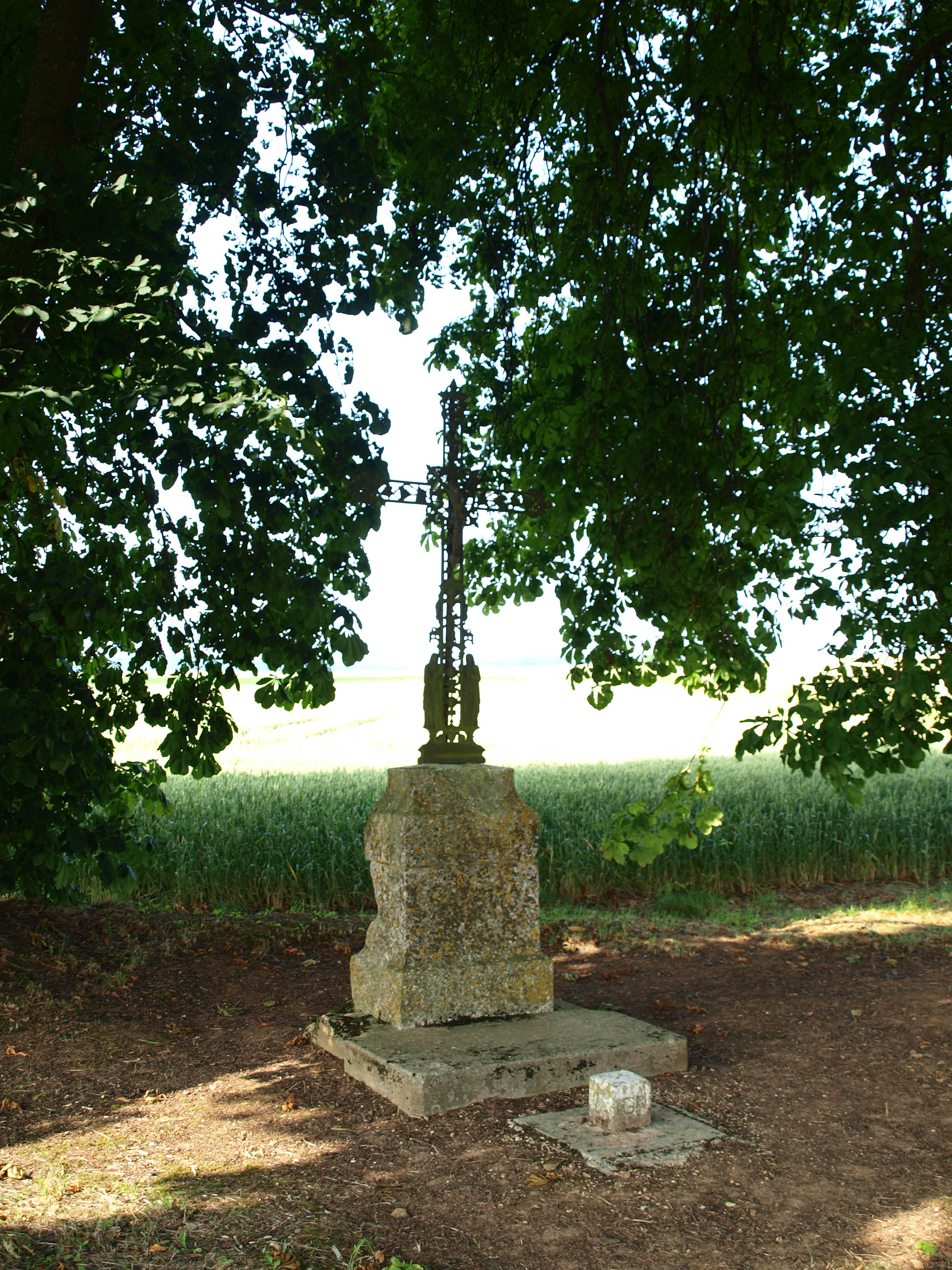
Wayside Cross

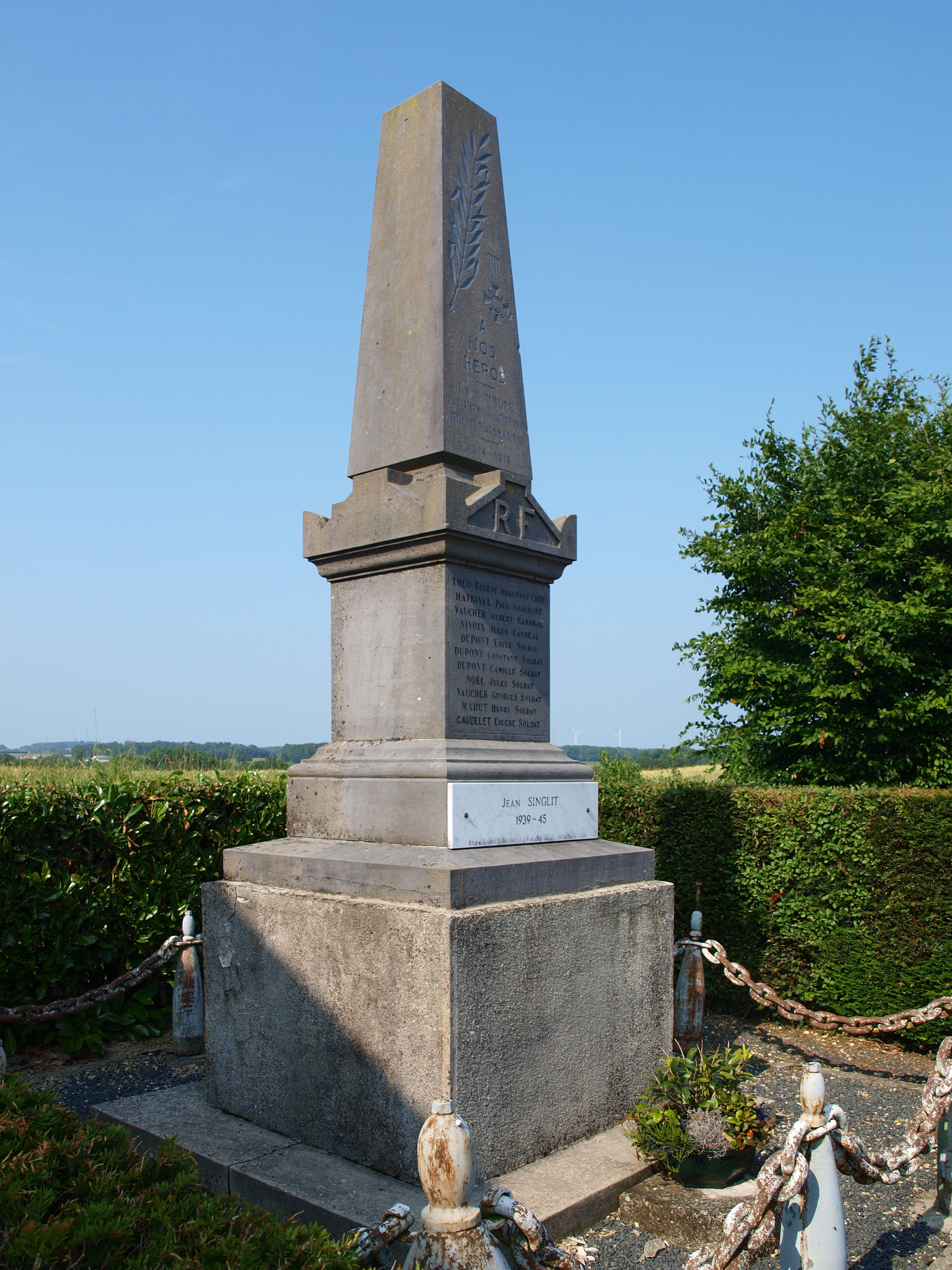
The War Memorial

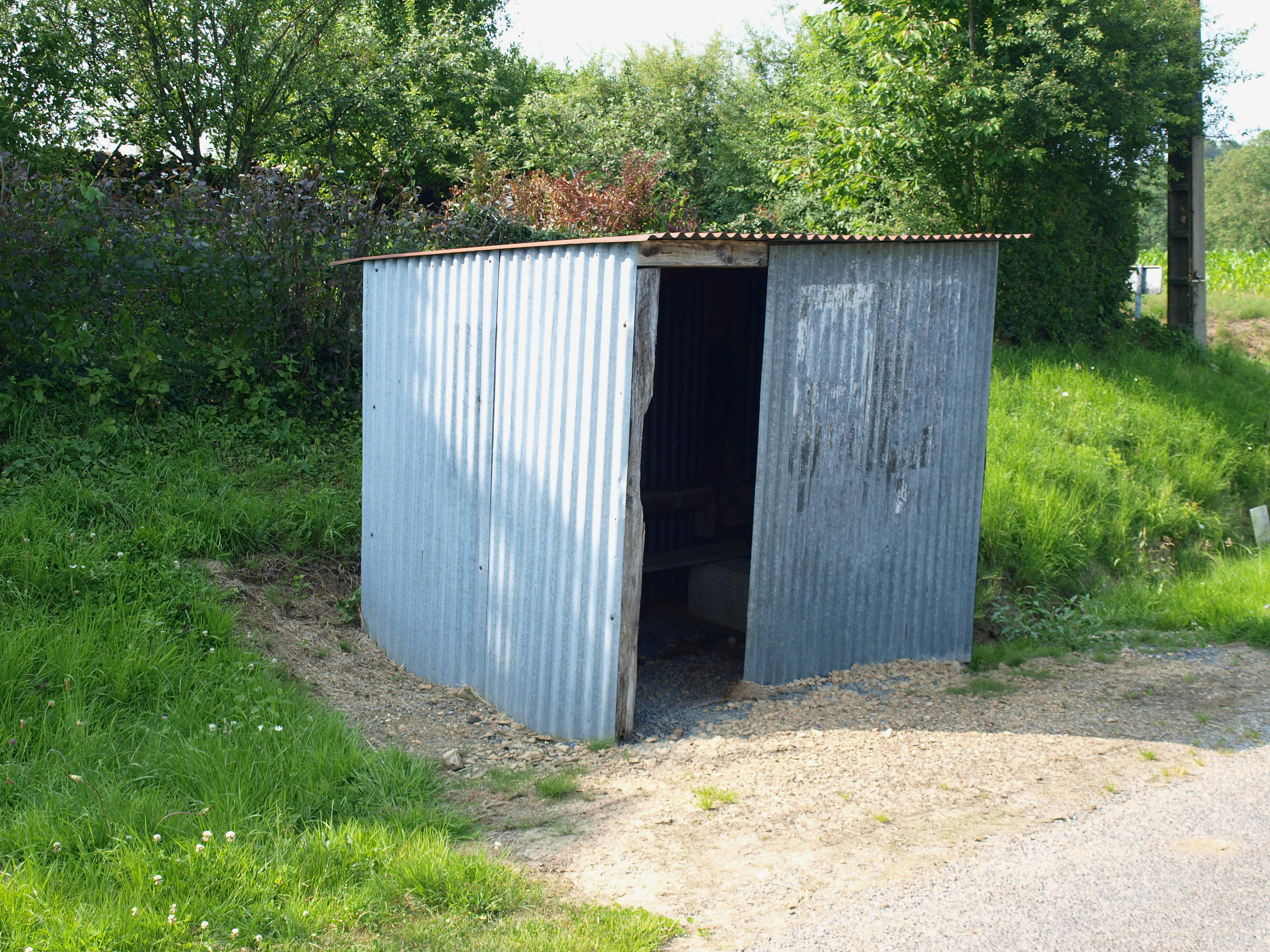
School bus stop

== See also ==
- Communes of the Ardennes department
