= Nicolas Changarnier =

French general (1793–1877)

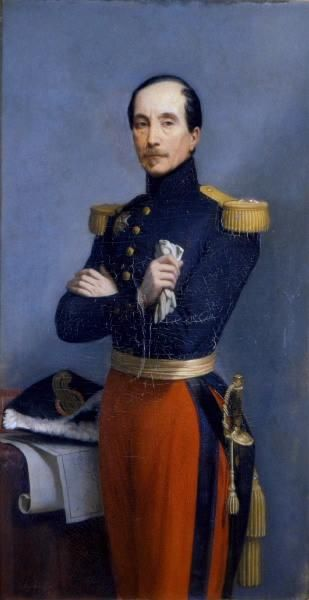
Portrait by Ary Scheffer, 1849

Nicolas Anne Theodule Changarnier (French pronunciation: [nikɔla an təɔdyl ʃɑ̃ɡaʁnje]; 26 April 1793 – 14 February 1877), French general, was born at Autun, Saône-et-Loire.

Educated at Saint-Cyr, he served for a short time in the bodyguard of Louis XVIII, and entered the line as a lieutenant in January 1815. He achieved distinction in the Spanish campaign of 1823, and became captain in 1825. In 1830 he entered the Royal Guard and was sent to North Africa, where he took part in the Mascara expedition. Promoted commandant in 1835, he distinguished himself under Marshal Clauzel in the campaign against Ahmed Pasha, bey of Constantine, and became lieutenant-colonel in 1837. The part he took in the, expedition of Portes-de-Fer gained him a colonelcy, and his success against the Hajutas and Kabyles, the cross of the Legion of Honour.

Three more years of brilliant service in Africa won for him the rank of marechal de camp in 1840, and of lieutenant-general in 1843. In 1847 he held the Algiers divisional command. He visited France early in 1848, assisted the provisional government to establish order, and returned to Africa in May to succeed General Cavaignac in the government of French Algeria. He was speedily recalled on his election to the general assembly for the Seine département, and received the command of the National Guard of Paris, to which was added soon afterwards that of the troops in Paris, altogether nearly 100,000 men. He held a high place and exercised great influence in the complicated politics of the next two years (for much more on Changarnier's activities during this time, see Karl Marx's Eighteenth Brumaire of Louis Bonaparte).

Changarnier ran for president in the election of 1848, but finished with 0.06 percent of the vote.

In 1849 Changarnier received the grand cross of the Legion of Honour. An avowed enemy of republican institutions, he held a unique position in upholding the power of the president; but in January 1851 he opposed Louis Napoleon's policy, was in consequence deprived of his double command, and at the coup d'état in December was arrested and sent to Mazas, until his banishment from France by the decree of January 9, 1852.

Changarnier returned to France after the general amnesty, and resided in his estate in the department of Saône-et-Loire. At the outbreak of the Franco-Prussian War in 1870 he held no command, but was present with the headquarters, and afterwards with Bazaine in Metz. He was employed on an unsuccessful mission to Prince Frederick Charles, commanding the German army which besieged Metz, and on the capitulation became a prisoner of war. At the armistice he returned to Paris, and in 1871 was elected to the National Assembly by four departments, and sat for the Somme. He took an active part in politics, defended the conduct of Marshal Bazaine, and served on the committee which elaborated the monarchical constitution. When the comte de Chambord refused the compromise, he moved the resolution to extend the executive power for ten years to Marshal MacMahon. He was elected a life senator in 1875.
