= Béni Mered =

- Commune and town
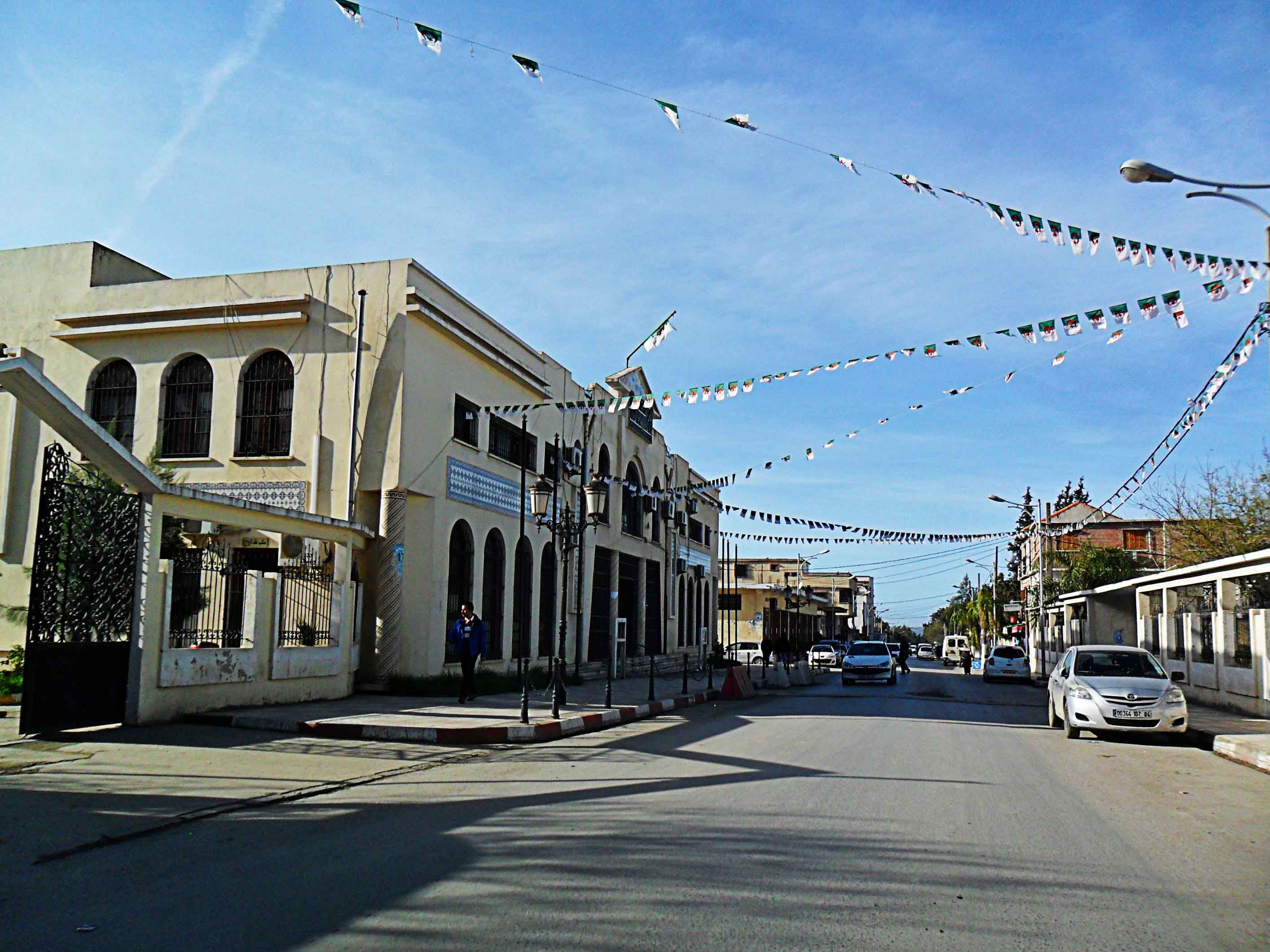
- Town hall in Beni Mered

- Location within Algeria
- Coordinates: 36°31′24″N 2°51′42″E
- Country: Algeria
- Province: Blida Province

Population (1998)
  - Total: 21,457
- Time zone: UTC+1 (CET)

Béni Mered or Beni Marad is a town and commune in Blida Province, Algeria. As of the 1998 census it had a population of 21,457.
