= Casbah of Dellys =

Historic kasbah or medina quarter in Dellys, Algeria

Coordinates: 36.9132158°N 03.9020107°E

The Casbah of Dellys (Arabic: قصبة دلس) is a historic kasbah or medina quarter, the old town in the city of Dellys, Algeria. The kasbah is known for Ottoman Algeria-era buildings and cityscape. Today it is a favorite spot for tourism in Boumerdès Province.

== History ==
The origin of the kasbah dates back to the 2nd century during the rule of the Ancient Carthage. Since then, several civilizations had claimed the kasbah, including the Romans, Islamic Empire and the Ottomans. During the early Muslim conquests, the kasbah was conquered by the Umayyad commander Musa bin Nusayr in 707. The medina was officially consolidated into the Ottoman territory in 1518. The kasbah remaining today is largely an establishment during the Ottoman era in the 16th century.

In the 17th century, the kasbah was expanded following the acceptance of one thousand Muslim families from Andalucia who were expelled by the Spanish Inquisition following the decree by Philip III of Spain in 1609.

== Sights ==
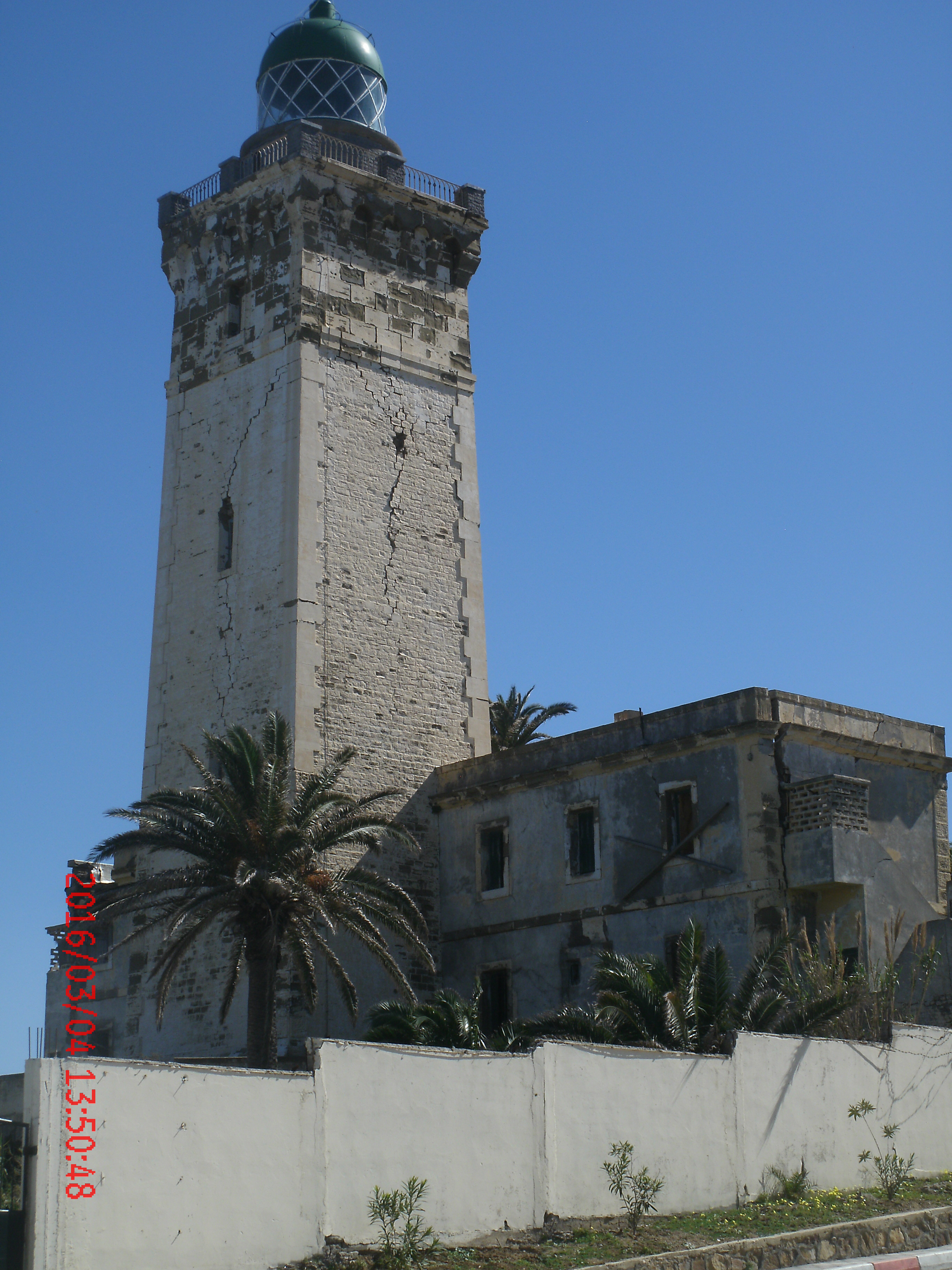
Cap Bengut Lighthouse, erected in 1881, designed in Islamic architectural style.

Similarly to the Casbah of Algiers, the Casbah of Dellys is broadly separated into the upper quarter and the lower quarter. The Casbah in Dellys is characterized by the lack of grandiose establishments such as palaces. This is because the casbah was built mainly for the citizens living there, in contrast to the casbah in Algiers which was developed as a seat of the Ottoman regents.

The upper and lower quarters are separated by the main street. The street was laid by the French occupational administration in 1844, at the expense of many Ottoman-era houses being demolished. There was a mosque known as Al-'Atiq Mosque built in Andalusian architecture, but it was demolished by the French as well in order to set up a military hospital. As a compensation, Al-Islah Mosque was constructed in the similar architectural style by the French administration in 1847.

The casbah contains around 250 historic houses, a madrasa which teaches the Qur'an known as Sidi Omar, and the Mausoleum of Sidi al-Harfi. Below it is the main port, overlooked by a long peninsula including the small lighthouse of Sidi Abdelkader, and about two kilometres to the east is the larger colonial-era lighthouse of Cap Bengut. The casbah is surrounded by an outer wall which guards the quarter. There are few remains of Phoenician-era buildings mostly in land, and this is due to Phoenicians concentrated their population center near the port. There is a Phoenician-era lighthouse located near the Sidi Abdelqadir harbor. The northern perimeter of the kasbah has secondary technological school, while on the southern perimeter it has the municipal office and more modern neighborhood. On the western border, it is parted by Bab al-Aswaf gate and the Mausoleum of Sidi Mansour. On the northwestern border, there is Bab al-Bustan gate and the Mausoleum of Sidi Zayd. Southeast border is parted by Bab al-Qaba'il gate.

== Condition ==
There are increasing voices for the more systematic conservation and restoration of the kasbah. In 2003, the kasbah was hit by the Boumerdès earthquake which lead to the even greater awareness. In 2009, the ministry of culture had conducted urgent restoration of some historically sensitive buildings. In 2010, the typological analysis of the historical establishments was conducted. In 2011, more comprehensive restoration work was implemented.

== Gallery ==
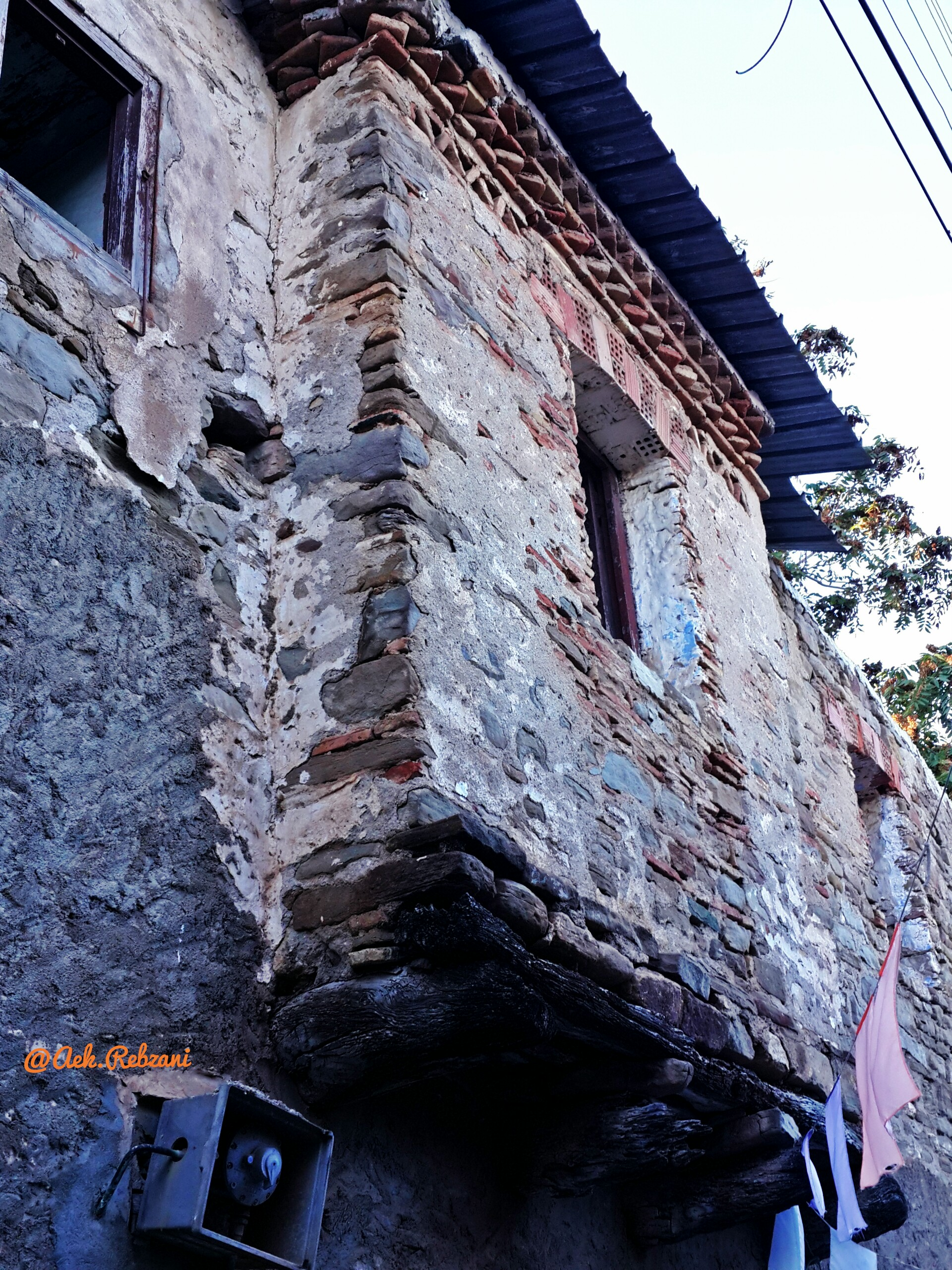
An oriel window in the casbah

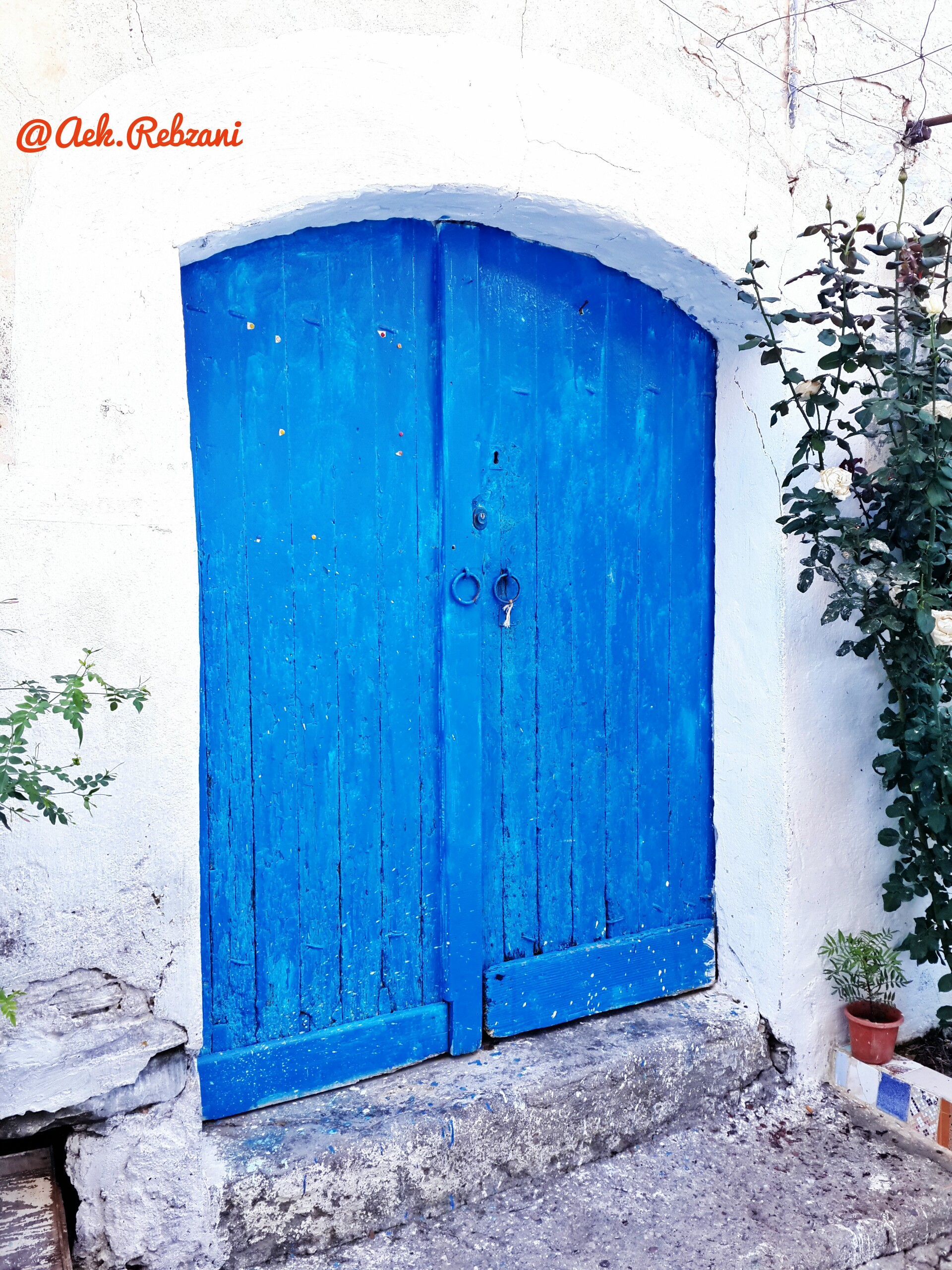
A door

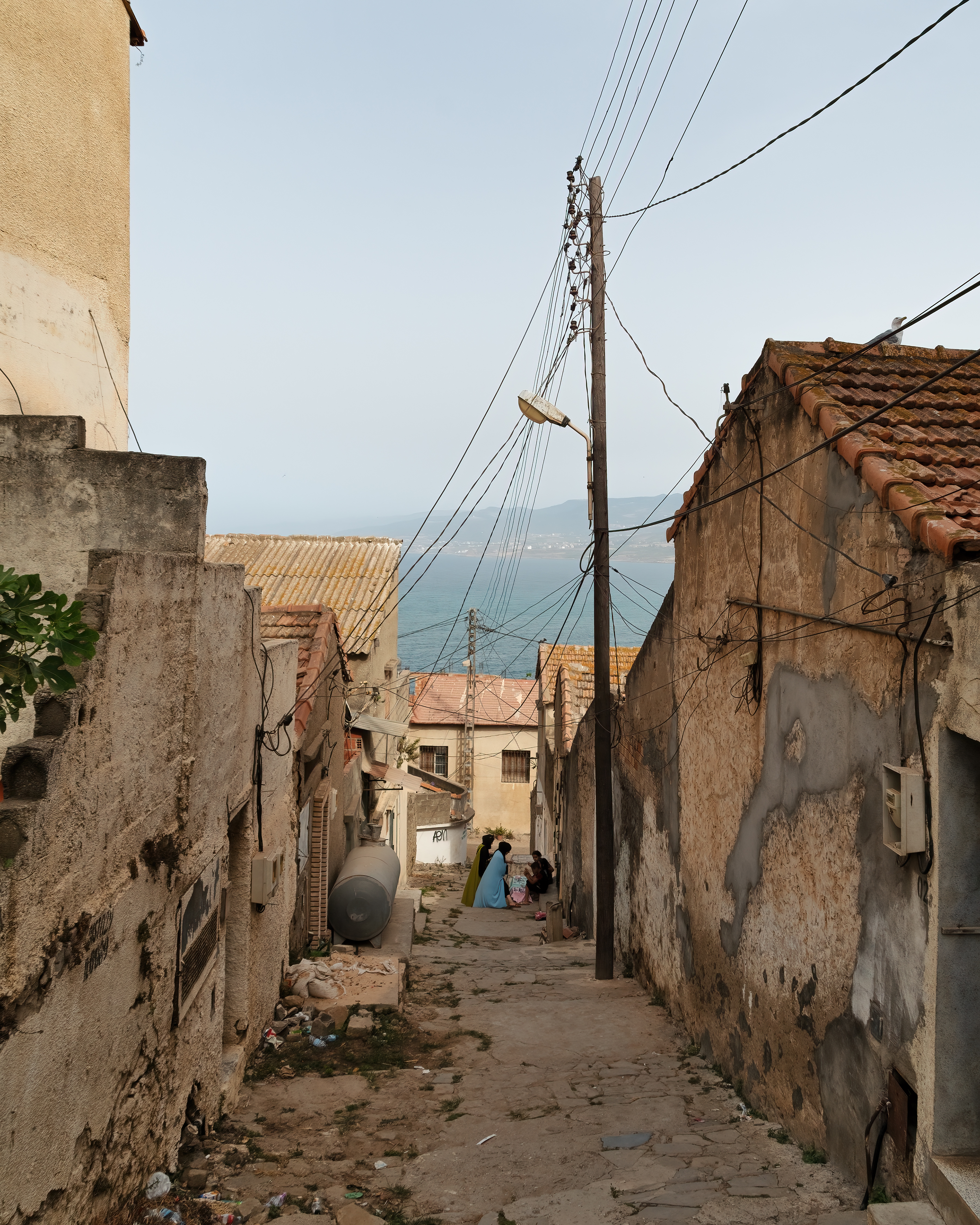
View of the lower Casbah

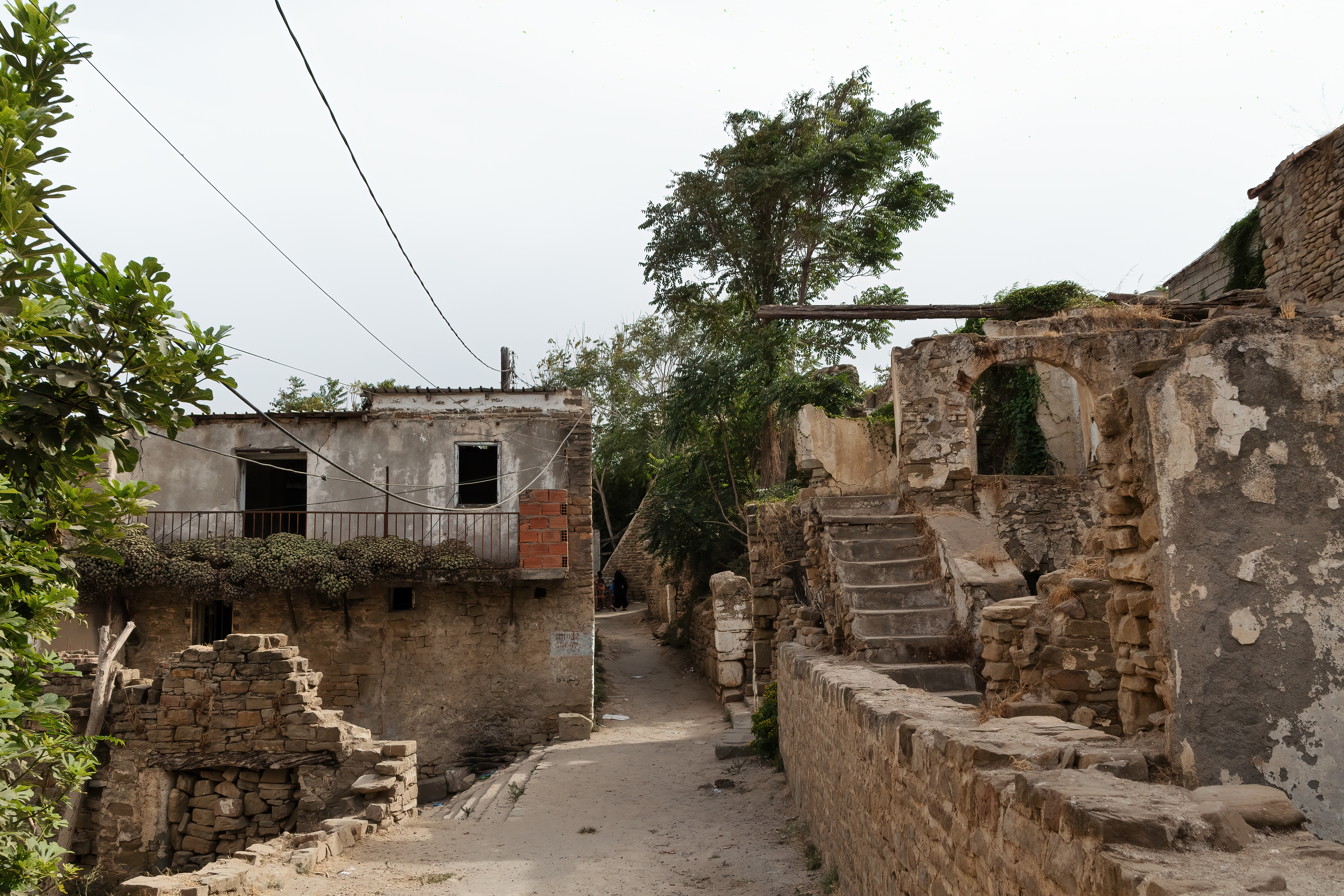
View of the lower Casbah

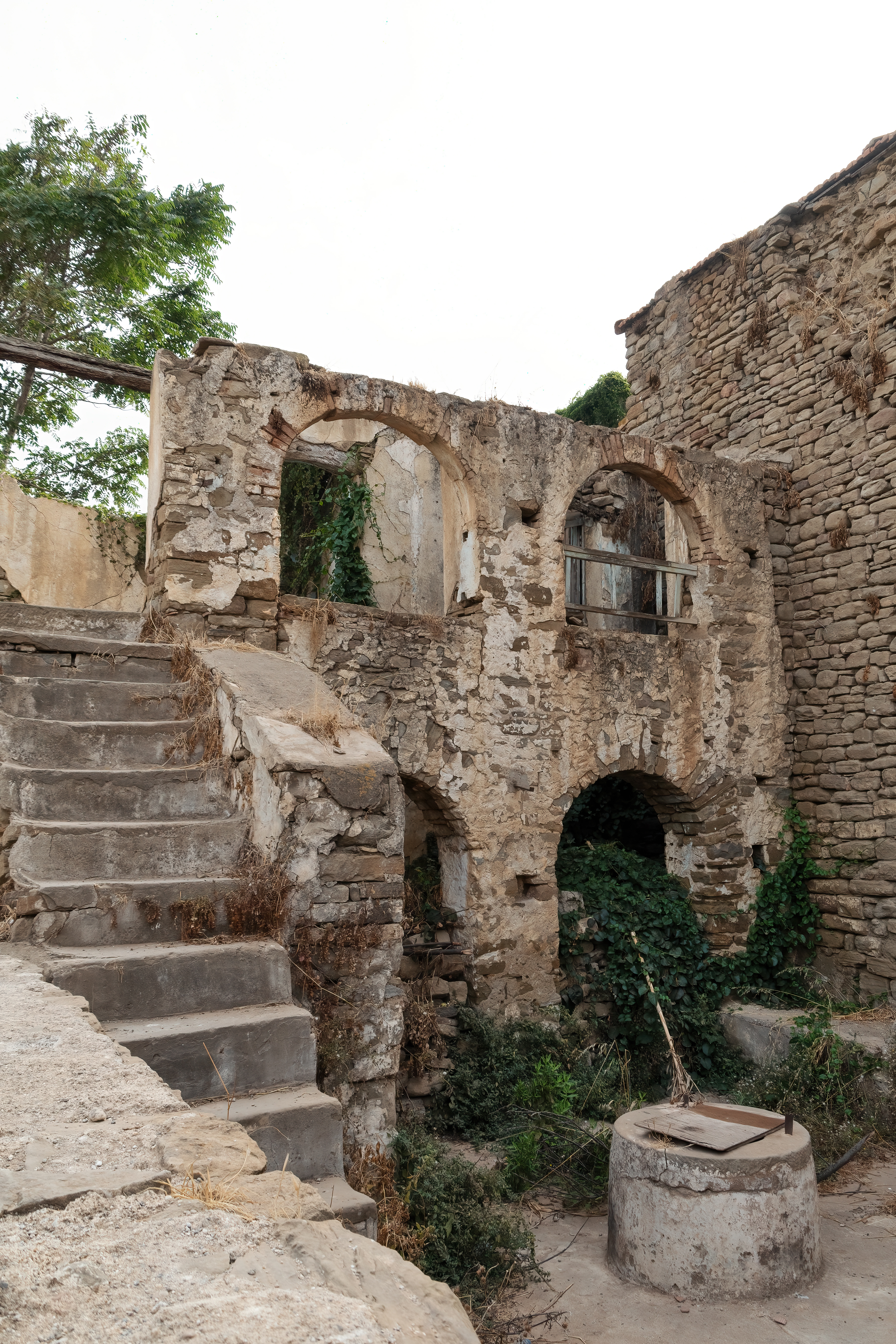
View of the lower Casbah

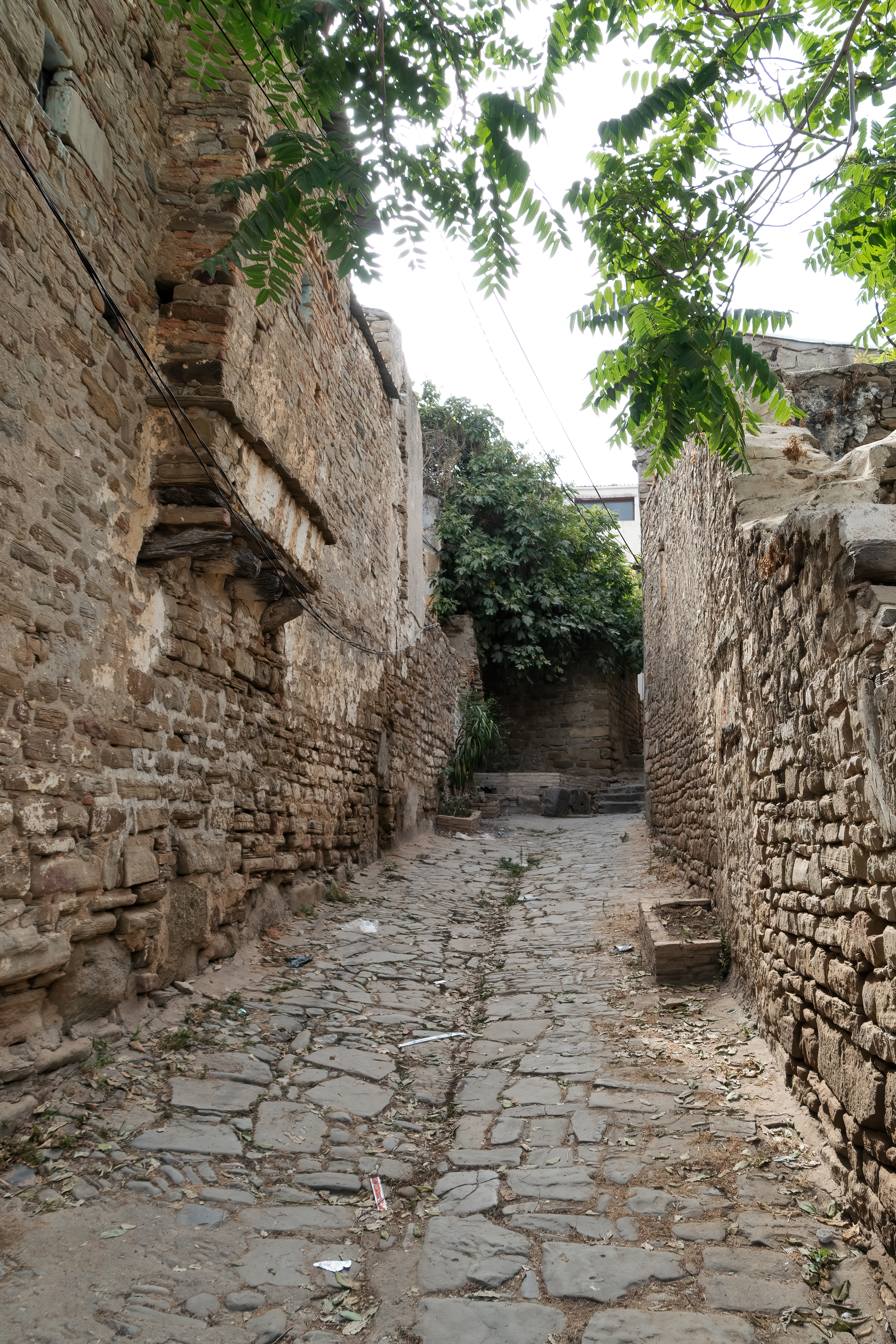
View of the lower Casbah

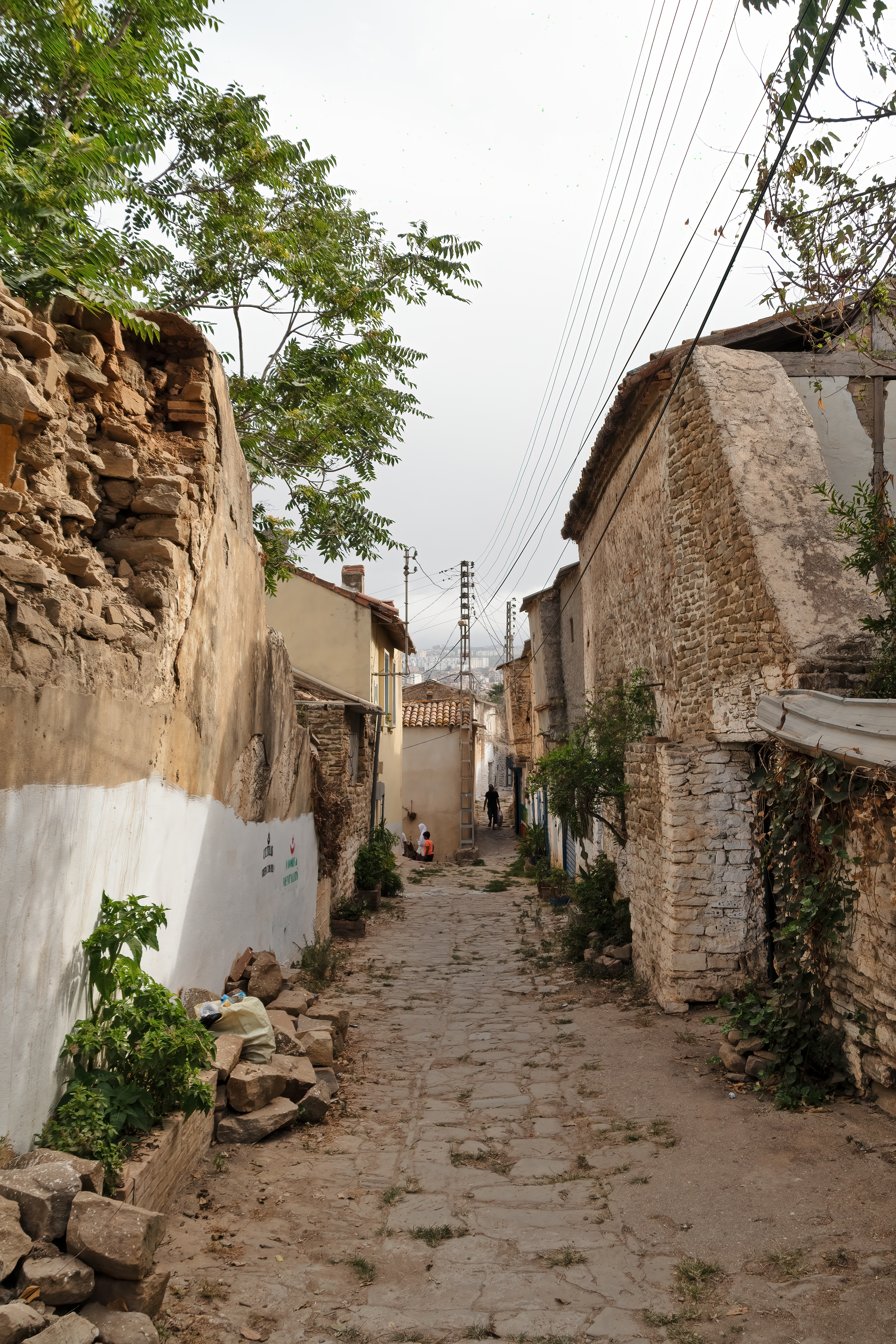
View of the lower Casbah

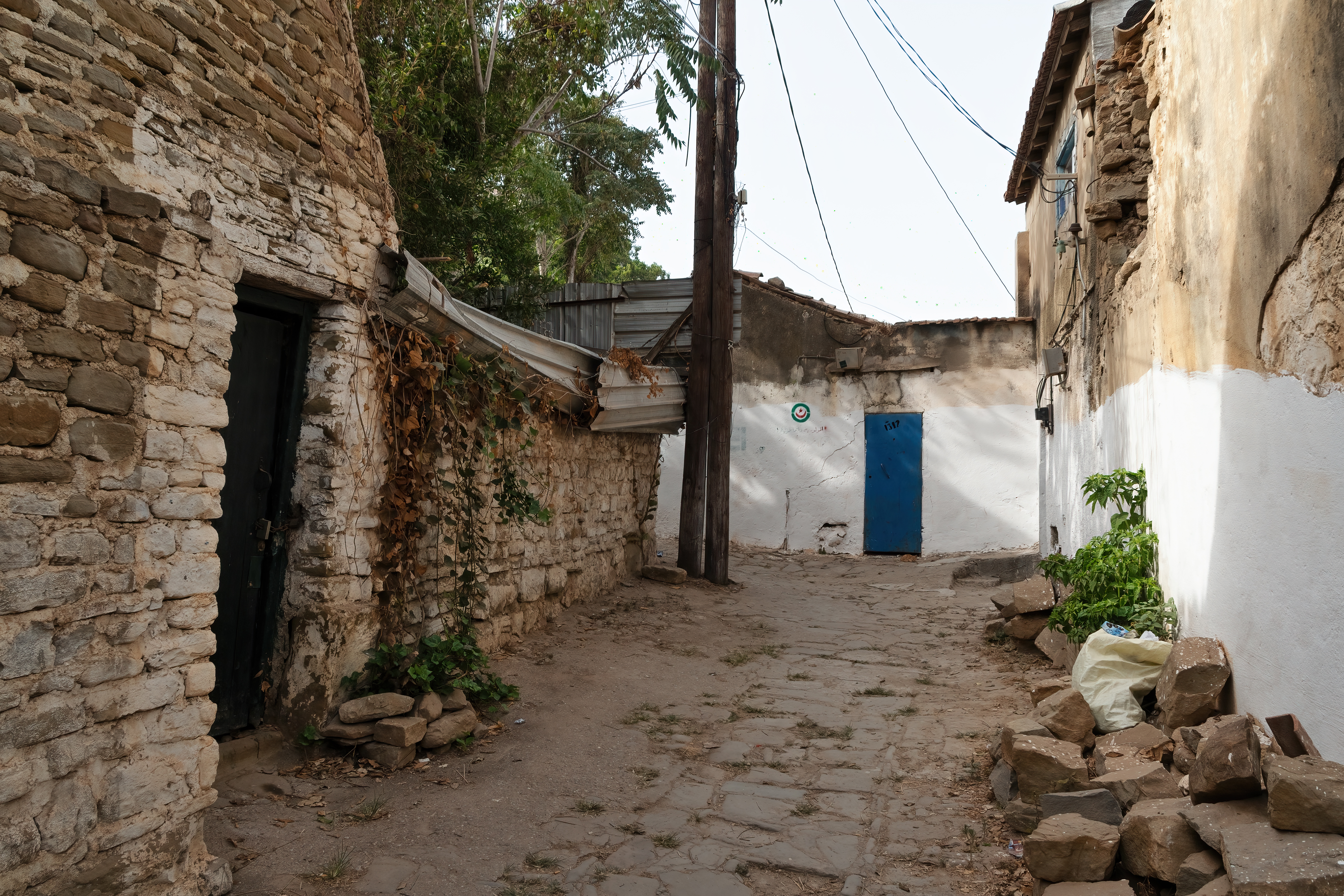
View of the lower Casbah

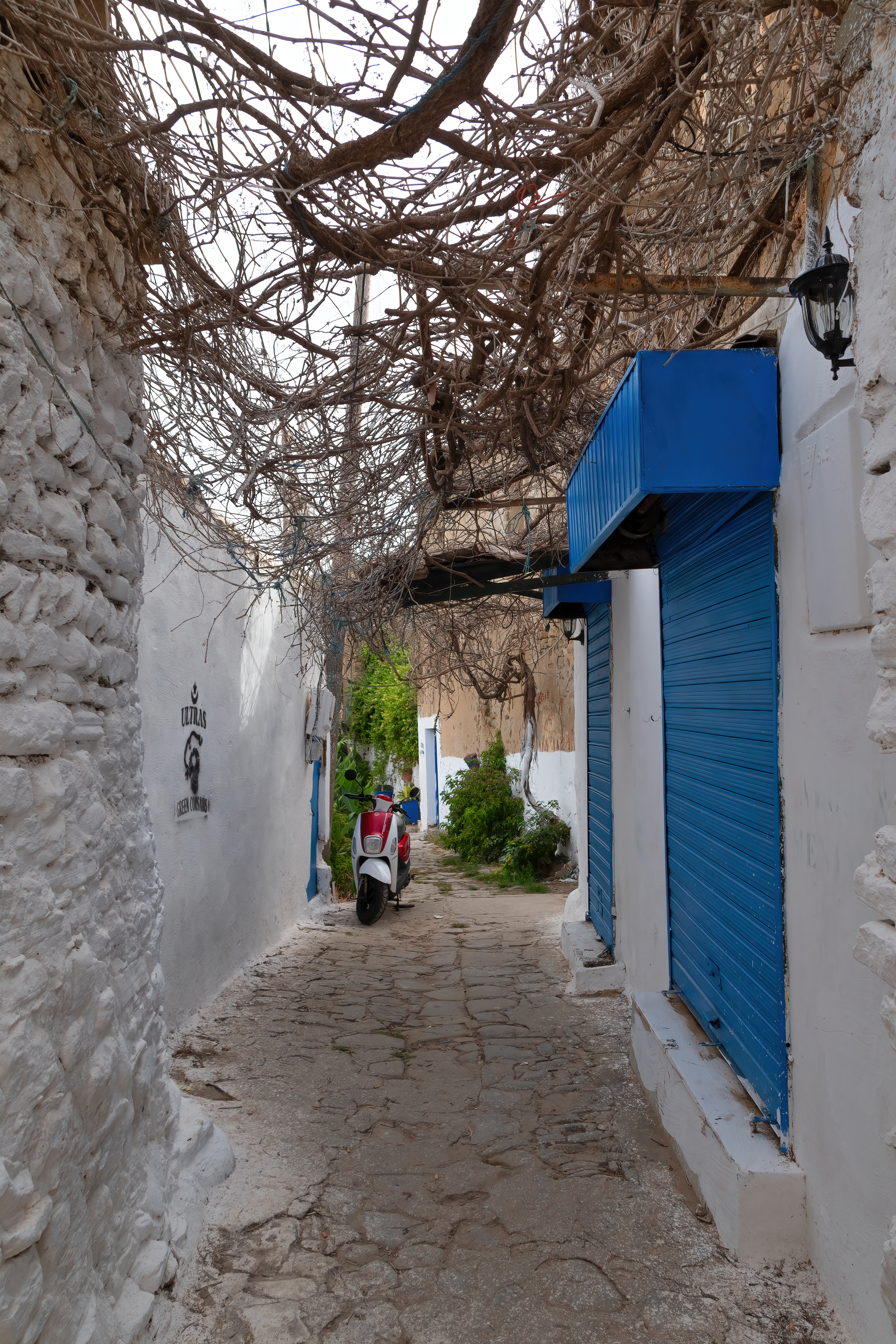
View of the lower Casbah

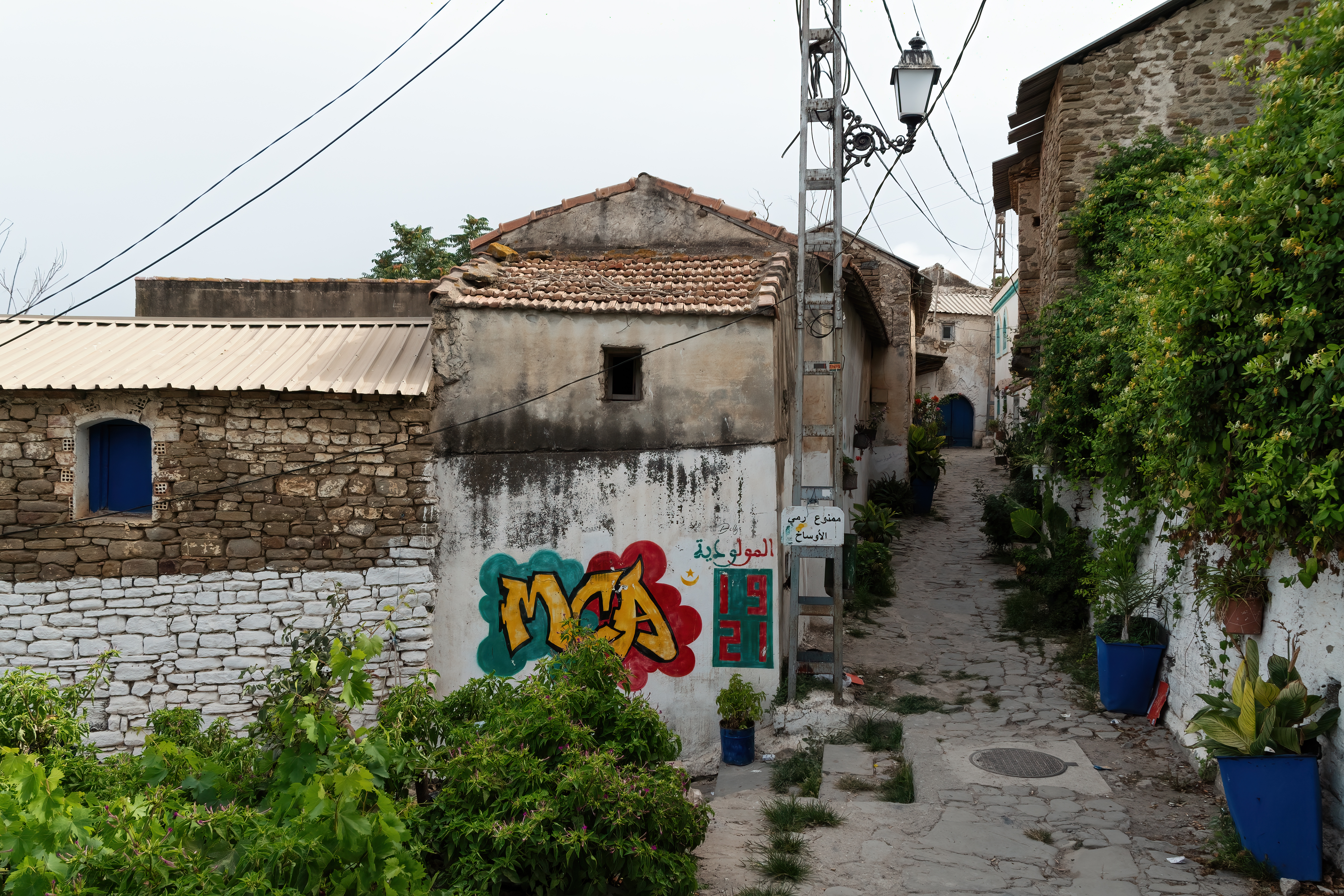
View of the lower Casbah

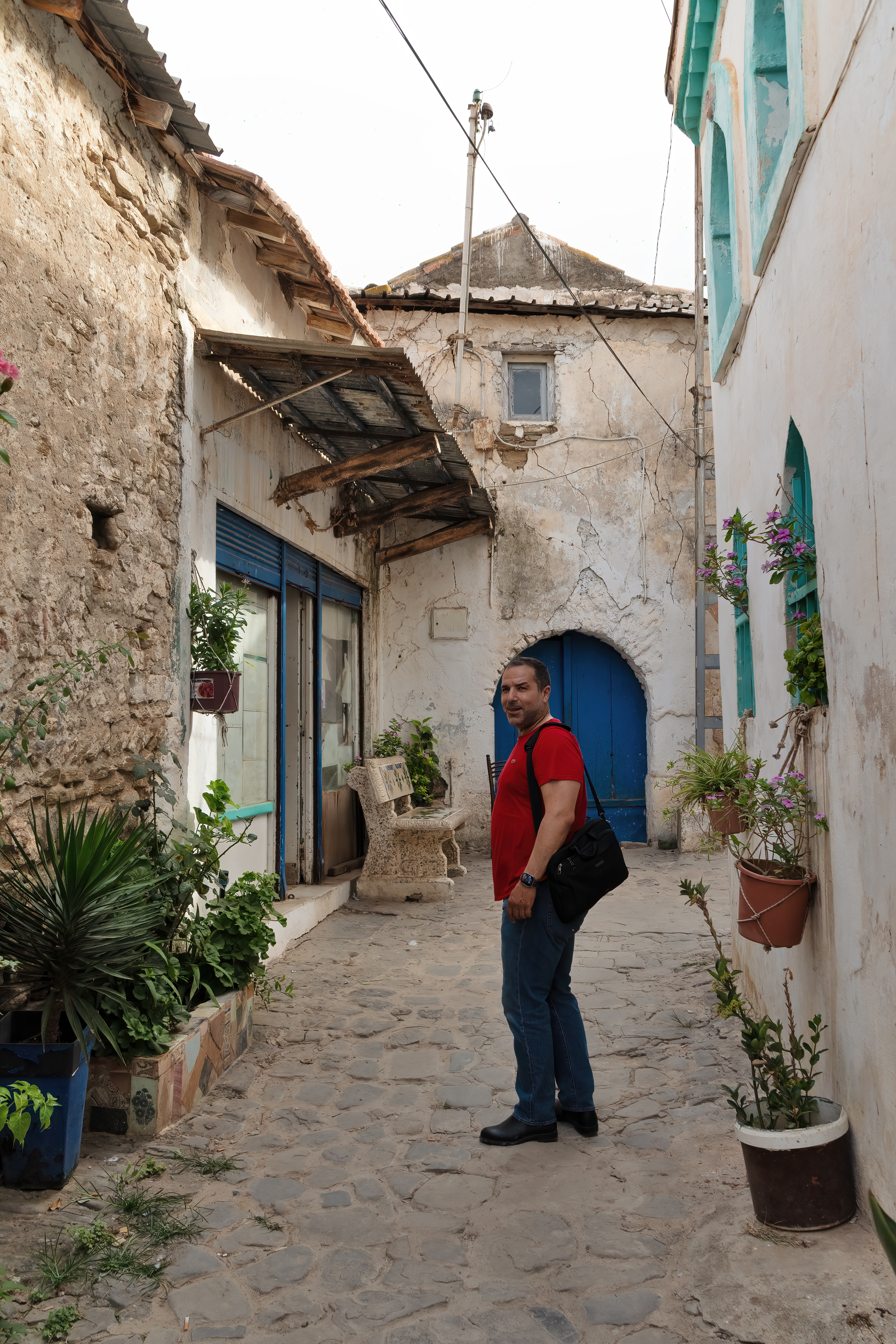
View of the lower Casbah

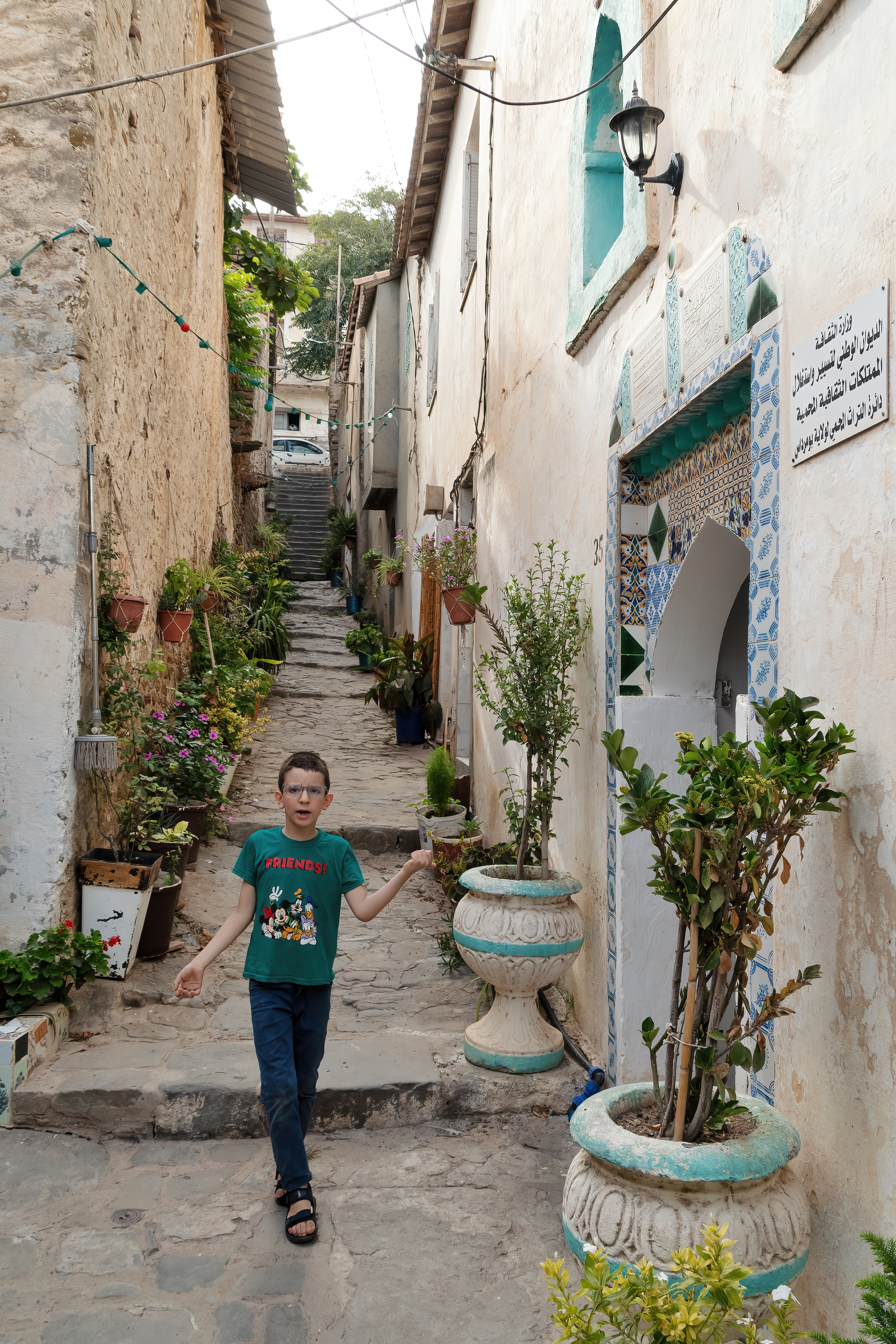
View of the lower Casbah

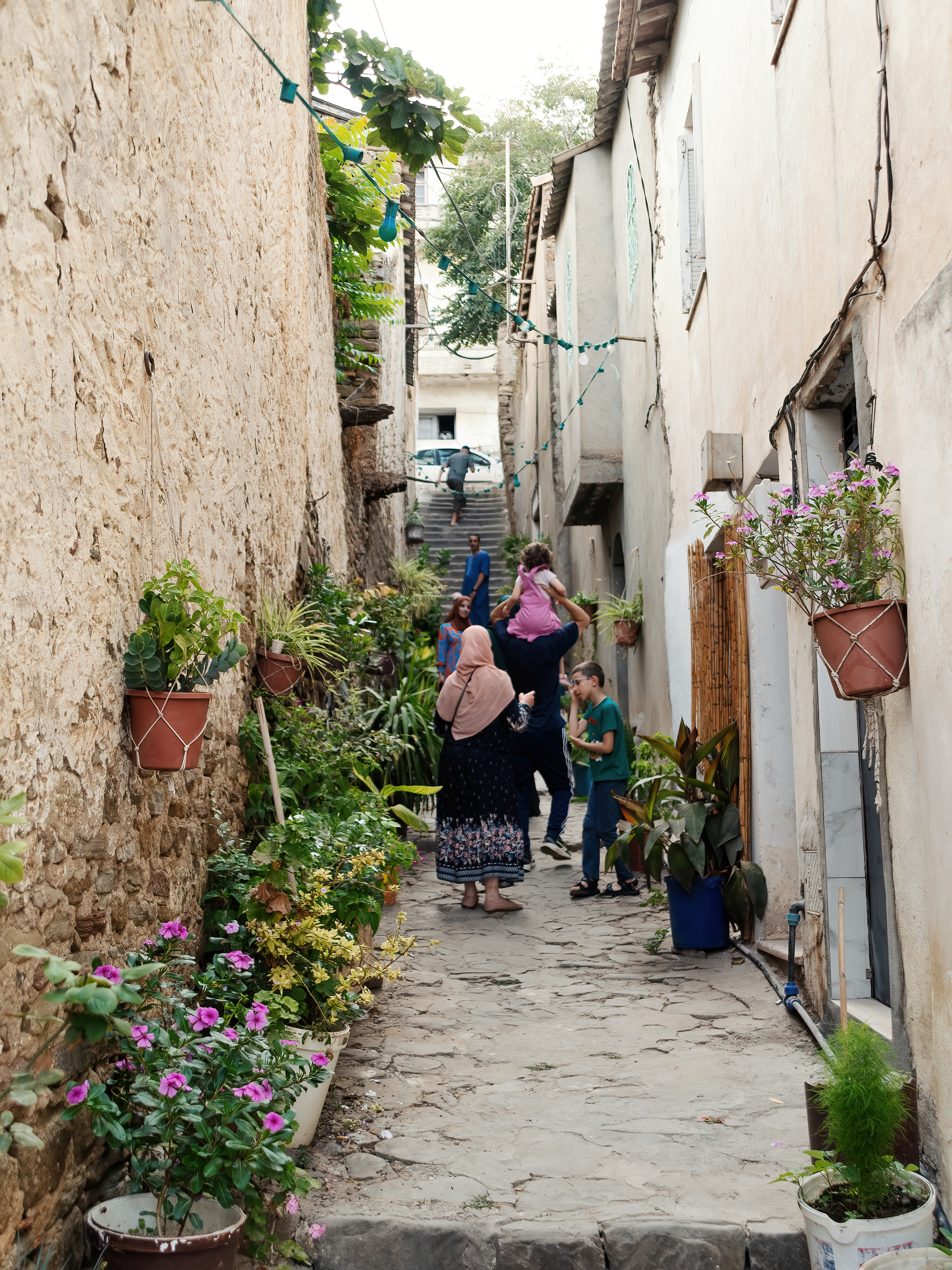
View of the lower Casbah

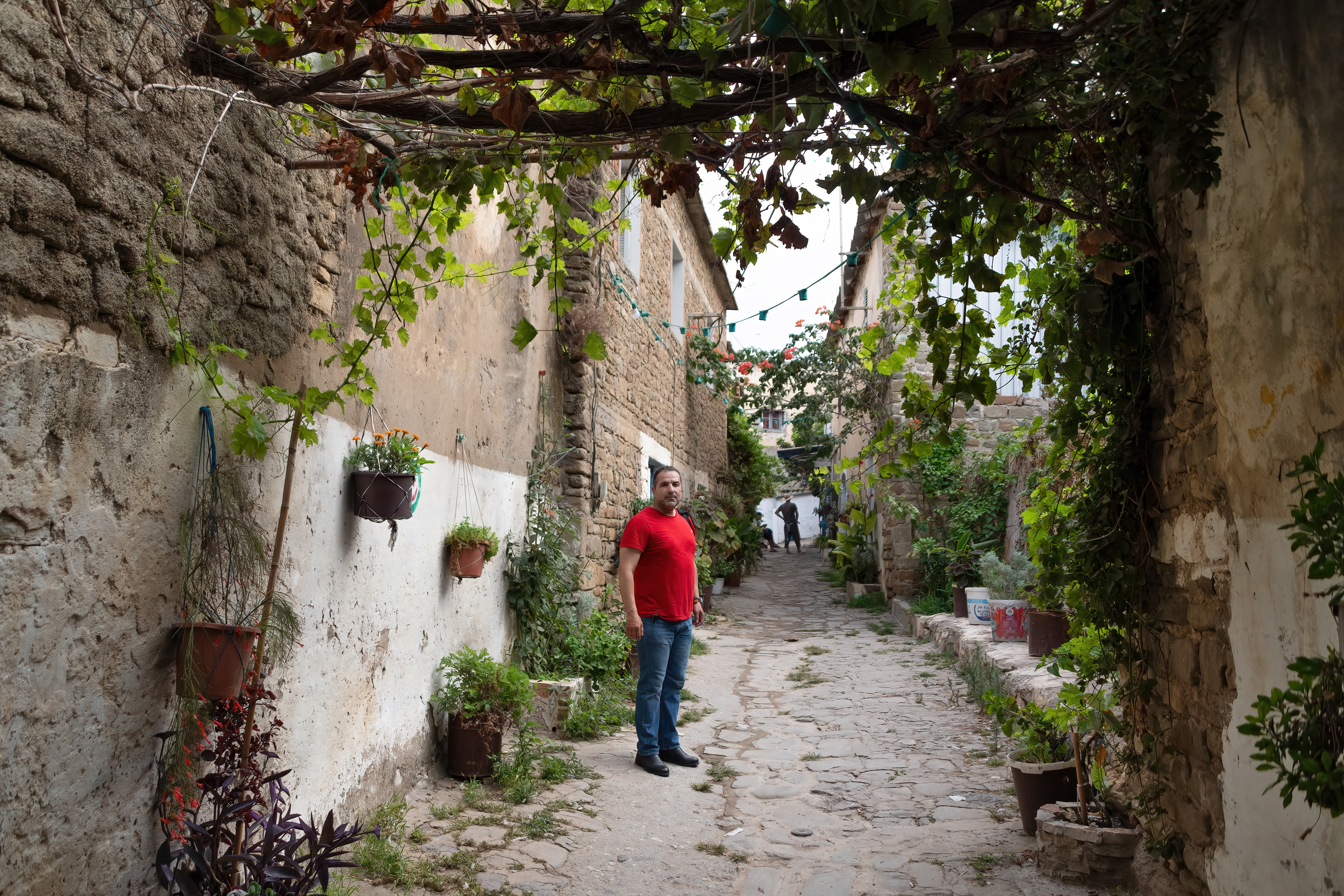
View of the lower Casbah

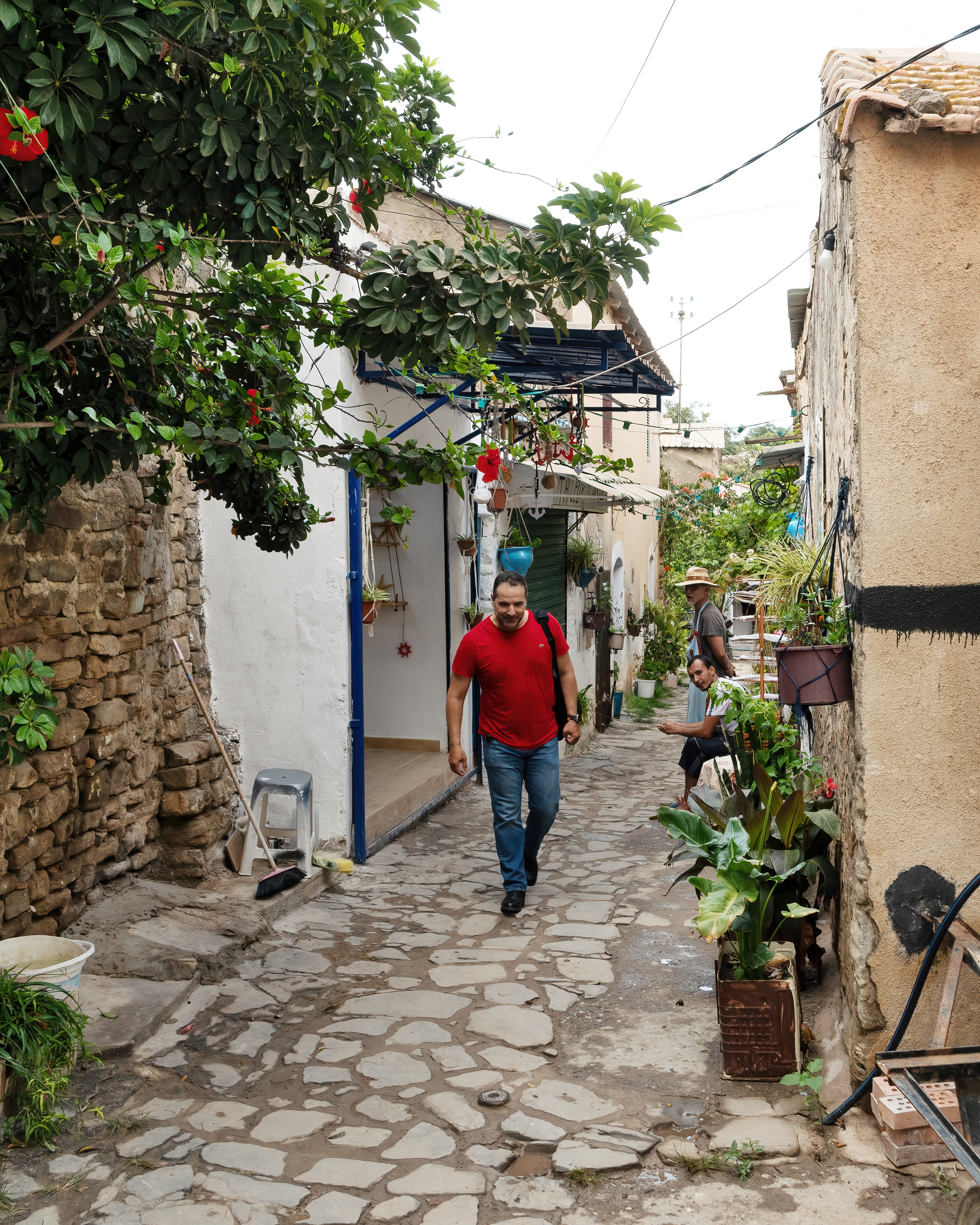
View of the lower Casbah

== See also ==
- French conquest of Algeria
- First Assault of Dellys (1837)
