= First Assault of Dellys =

First Assault of Dellys (1837)
- Part of the French conquest of Algeria
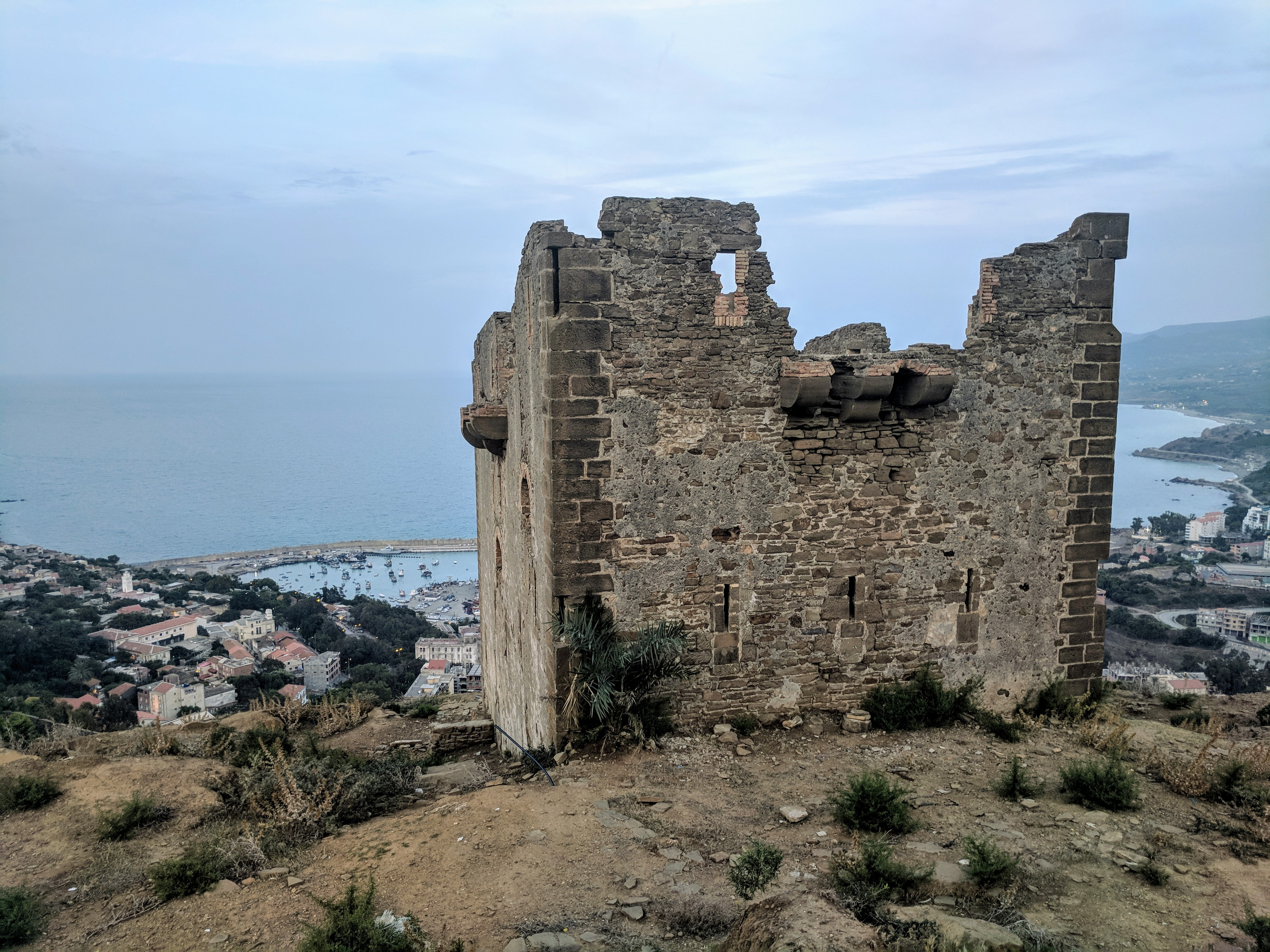
- Qubba of Sidi Soussan overlooking Dellys.
Date	28–30 May 1837
Location	Dellys, Kabylia, Algeria 36.915789°N 3.9146904°E
Result	French victory

Belligerents
Emirate of Abdelkader	France

Commanders and leaders
Emir Abdelkader; Emir Mustapha	(France) Damrémont (France) Defresne (France) Assigny

Strength
Kabyles	Troupes coloniales; French Navy

The First Assault of Dellys in May 1837, during the French conquest of Algeria, opposed the troupes coloniales under Corvette captain Félix-Ariel d'Assigny (1794–1846) to the resistance fighters of the town of Dellys in Kabylia of the Igawawen.

== Historical Context ==
When the Emir Mustapha organized on 8 May 1837 the first attack of his Kabylian allies against a colonial agricultural farm in Reghaïa within Mitidja plain, the French response was not long in coming against the attackers.

The then French governor of Algiers, General Damrémont, then ordered the Kabyles to be punished by a military expedition on 17 May 1837 commanded by Colonel Schauenburg by land, and General Perregaux by sea against the tribes of Beni Aïcha, Issers and Amraoua.

The Kabyle rebels then retaliated by attacking the Boudouaou military camp on 25 May 1837, which was under the command of Captain de La Torré.

General Damrémont took advantage of this uprising east of Mitidja to set up an imposing military campaign on 27 May 1837 towards the valley of Oued Isser in order to suffocate this insurrectionary stronghold which harassed the colonial power of Algiers, by involving General Lixières.

It was then that the Sufi marabouts of Zawiyet Sidi Amar Cherif negotiated a cease-fire with the French which made it possible to stop the hostilities between the two belligerents.

== Naval expedition ==
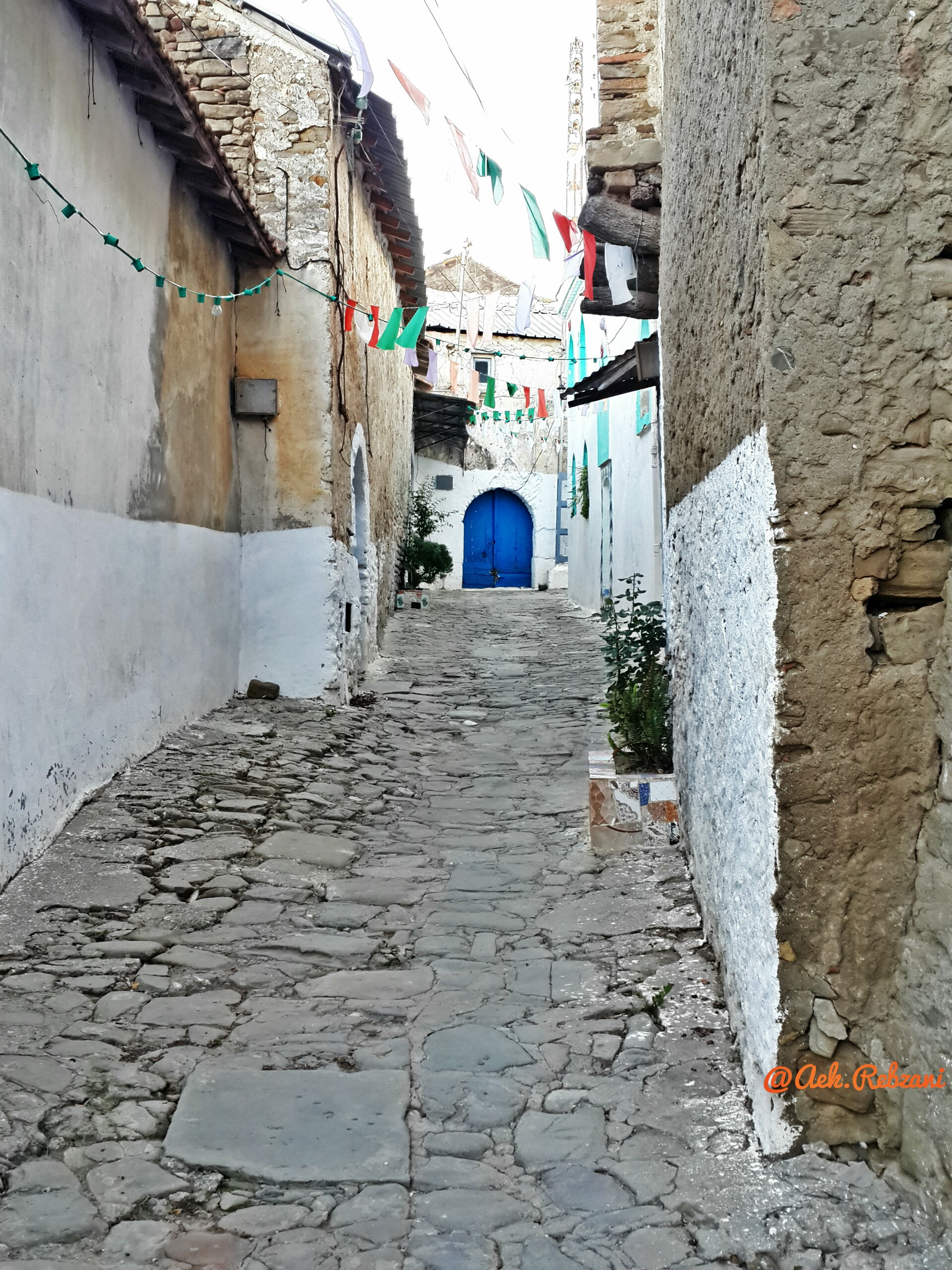
Casbah of Dellys

General Damrémont had opted in May 1837 to stop hostilities between the French and the Kabyles by reversing the balance of power by land and by sea.

The commander of the navy in Algiers, named Félicité-Louis-Urbain Menouvrier-Defresne (died 1848), therefore sent on 28 May 1837 in the morning a fleet of two boats from the port of Algiers to dock in the port of Dellys and submit the Casbah of Dellys in this city to colonial power, under the command of the corvette captain and chief of staff Félix-Ariel d'Assigny.

The end of the fighting in the Issers plain then accelerated the abdication of this coastal town which was thus deprived of its protective shield from rebels who encouraged it to be and remain a subversive center distant from a few tens of kilometers of the Casbah of Algiers.

== Disembarkation of Dellys ==
The steamboat Le Cerbère and the scow La Lionne that presented themselves on 28 May 1837 in the cove of the port of Dellys found no Algerian resistance when French soldiers landed on the shore as the victors.

The two boats arrived in the cove which forms Cape Bengut and presented themselves in front of the town of Dellys where the ship Le Cerbère anchored in thirteen fathoms of water within cannon-range of the Dellys Casbah, while La Lionne continued to keep under sails.

The two crews then took the necessary measures to begin the attack and the destruction of the houses of the Casbah placed in amphitheater and degraded.

The population of the city was frightened by these devastating preparations, and then immediately sent a dinghy aboard Le Cerbère to enter into life-saving talks to save the city from its impending destruction.

The French soldiers had for mission to subdue this Kabyle and strategic city, and to summon its inhabitants to send their notables as hostages and negotiators to Algiers, and to compensate the farmers Mercier and Saussine, owners of the farm which suffered the looting and sacking of the First Raid on Reghaïa dated 8 May 1837 under the command of Emir Mustapha.

This is how the commander d'Assigny, who had received strict and severe orders to be executed in the rebel town in the Amraoua region, having asked the Algerian delegation for a prompt response of submission to the injunctions of General Damrémont.

== Capitulation ==
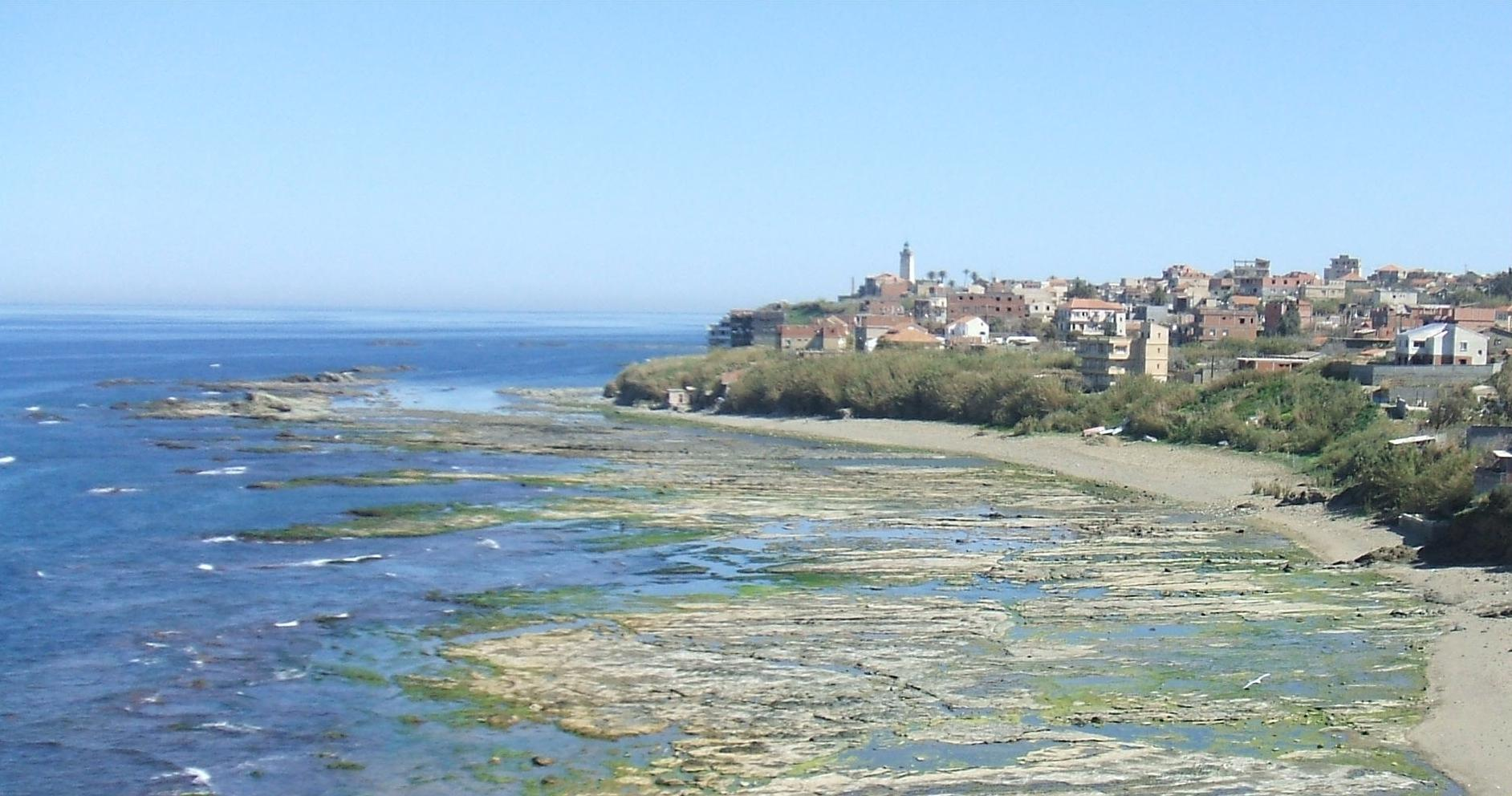
Coast of Dellys.

The notables of the town of Dellys organized on 28 May 1837 the capitulation and surrender of the town to the French armed force in order to protect the townspeople and their property from possible military reprisals.

But these notables were not in a position to comply with the city's surrender injunctions, and they had to appoint eight dignitaries from among the main inhabitants who came aboard the Le Cerbère vessel to meet Commander Félix-Ariel.

It is thus that the mufti El Mouloud ben El Hadj Allal, the cadi Si Ahmed El Mufti, the marabout of Zawiyet Sidi Amar Cherif and the principal inhabitants and notables of Dellys went aboard the ship Le Cerbère, and were brought in the night of 29 May 1837 as hostages to Algiers by the commander d'Assigny.

The few difficulties which marred the talks on the ship, as regards the surrender, led to this transfer of this delegation to Algiers where they were waiting for a favorable decision to be taken in their regard.

These notables of Dellys agreed with General Damrémont to pay compensation to the French settlers Mercier and Saussine who had suffered losses in the attack of the Amraoua and other Kabyles dated 8 May 1837 against their farm of Reghaïa.

The counterpart of this reimbursement consisted in releasing the notables of Dellys and letting them return home as part of a lasting peace pact.

At the end of this naval expedition, an honor was awarded to the French soldiers who took part in it, and more particularly to their leader Félix-Ariel d'Assigny who led it, because the expected results were obtained without bloodshed.

== Factory of Dellys ==
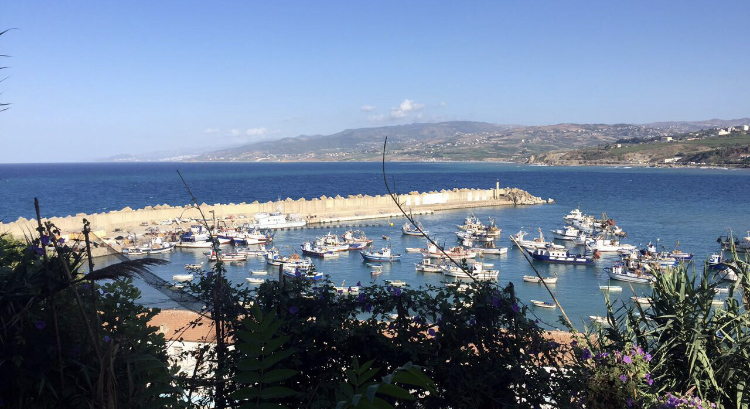
Port of Dellys.

The deputies of the Issers and the notables of Dellys asked General Damrémont after their release to commit to establishing a French trading post in the city of Dellys in return for a lasting ceasefire in the Amraoua region.

But the French governor of Algiers told them that a stationary military regiment would have to be installed to protect this trading post in Kabylia.

Damrémont's response also noted that trade between Algiers and Dellys was not yet flourishing enough to justify the investment and expense that this trade measure would entail.

But the city of Dellys with its 2,000 inhabitants at the time, its small fishing port, and its ten buildings dedicated to the coveted trading post, could prosper a trade between this cultivated country area and the city of Algiers by supplying it with grains and fruits.

== See also ==
- Casbah of Dellys
- Zawiyet Sidi Amar Cherif
- Zawiyas in Algeria
- History of Algeria
- Emir Abdelkader
- Emir Mustapha
- Emirate of Abdelkader
- Igawawen
- Khachna Massif
- French conquest of Algeria
- First Raid on Reghaïa
- Expedition of the Col des Beni Aïcha
- First Battle of Boudouaou
- First Battle of the Issers
- List of French governors of Algeria
- Charles-Marie Denys de Damrémont
- Maximilien Joseph Schauenburg
- Alexandre Charles Perrégaux
- Antoine de La Torré
- Félix-Ariel d'Assigny

== Bibliography ==
- Léon Galibert (1843). Histoire de l'Algérie ancienne et moderne. Paris: Furne et Cie, Libraires-Éditeurs. p. 475.
- Edmond Pellissier de Reynaud (1854). Annales algériennes, Volume 2. Paris: Librairie Militaire. p. 180.
- Victor Bérard (1867). Indicateur général d'Algérie. Algiers: Bastide, Libraire-Éditeur. p. 185.
- Ferdinand-Philippe d'Orléans (1870). Campagnes de l'armée d'Afrique, 1835-1839. Paris: Michel Lévy Frères. p. 282.
- Société Historique Algérienne (1875). Revue africaine, Numéros 109 à 120. Algiers: Adolphe Jourdan, Libraire-Éditeur. p. 209.
- Société Historique Algérienne (1876). Revue africaine, Volume 20. Algiers: Adolphe Jourdan, Libraire-Éditeur. p. 209.
- Charles Marie Denis Damrémont (1927). Correspondance du général Damrémont. Paris: H. Champion, Libraire-Éditeur. p. 191.
