= Félix-Ariel d'Assigny =

French naval officer (1794-1846)

- Born: Félix-Ariel Flamen d'Assigny; 21 June 1794; Paris, France
- Died: 11 August 1846 (aged 52); Toulon, France
- Military career
- Allegiance: France
- Branch: French Navy
- Rank: Corvette captain
- Conflicts: French conquest of Algeria; Shipwreck of Dellys (1830); First Assault of Dellys (1837)
- Awards: Order of the Sword; Legion of Honour

Félix-Ariel Flamen d'Assigny (born in Paris on 21 June 1794 and died in Toulon on 11 August 1846) was a French naval officer who participated to the French conquest of Algeria.

== Family ==
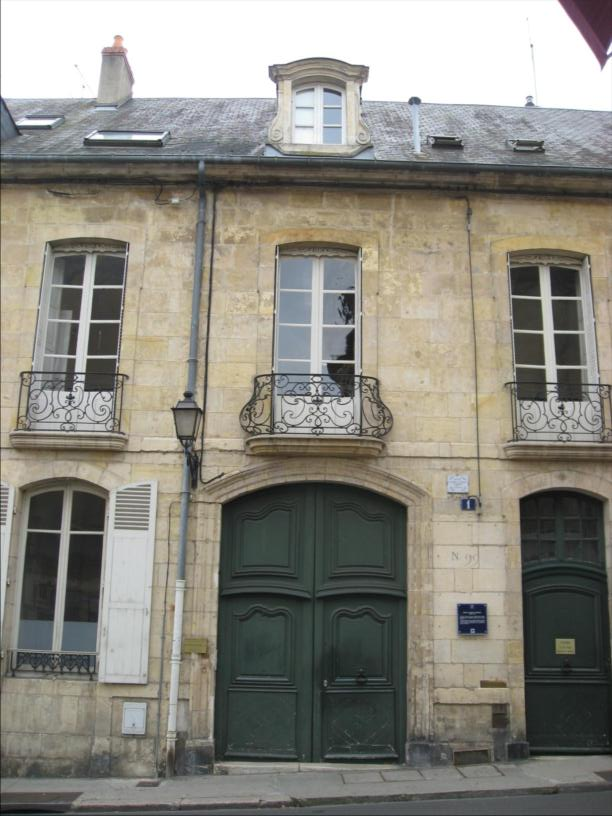
Family house of the Flamen d'Assigny in Nevers.

Félix-Ariel Flamen d'Assigny was born in the city of Nevers, and his father is Gilbert Flamen d'Assigny (1743-1819) who was Minister Plenipotentiary of Louis XVI at the Court of Bavaria.

His father married Reine-Henriette Bourgeois de Moléron on 1796 who bore him three children, dnd Felix Ariel had thus for siblings only one brother named Benjamin Flamen d'Assigny and only one other sister.

== Lieutenant of Navy (1823) ==
Félix-Ariel was appointed to the military rank of Lieutenant of Navy on 16 August 1823.

This appointment was then signed by the then Minister Secretary of State for the Navy and the Colonies Aimé Marie Gaspard de Clermont-Tonnerre (1779-1865).

== Shipwreck of Dellys (1830) ==
On 15 May 1830, two brigs belonging to the French navy and mobilized in the blockade station of Algiers were lost in the Mediterranean Sea.

The brig Le Silène was commanded by Captain Armand Joseph Bruat (1796-1855), while brig L'Aventure was commanded by Captain d'Assigny and the Captain Louis-Léopold-Édouard Bonnard.

These two military ships had been thrown to the Barbary Coast under Cape Bengut in the vicinity of Dellys.

The two hundred men who formed the crews of the two stranded brigs had fallen hostages into the hands of the Kabyles of the Amraoua tribe.

The Kabyles had divided the French soldiers into two groups, the first of which, composed of many sailors, was totally massacred.

When Commander Bruat, who was part of the second group that had been released, arrived in the Casbah of Algiers, he was saddened to see a hundred and ten heads exposed of the unfortunate French sailors who had been killed.

With eighty-five of them who still survived this tragic event, Bruat was locked up in Algiers prison while waiting for the French Army to come to deliver them alive or to avenge them if they were also massacred.

== Corvette captain (1831) ==
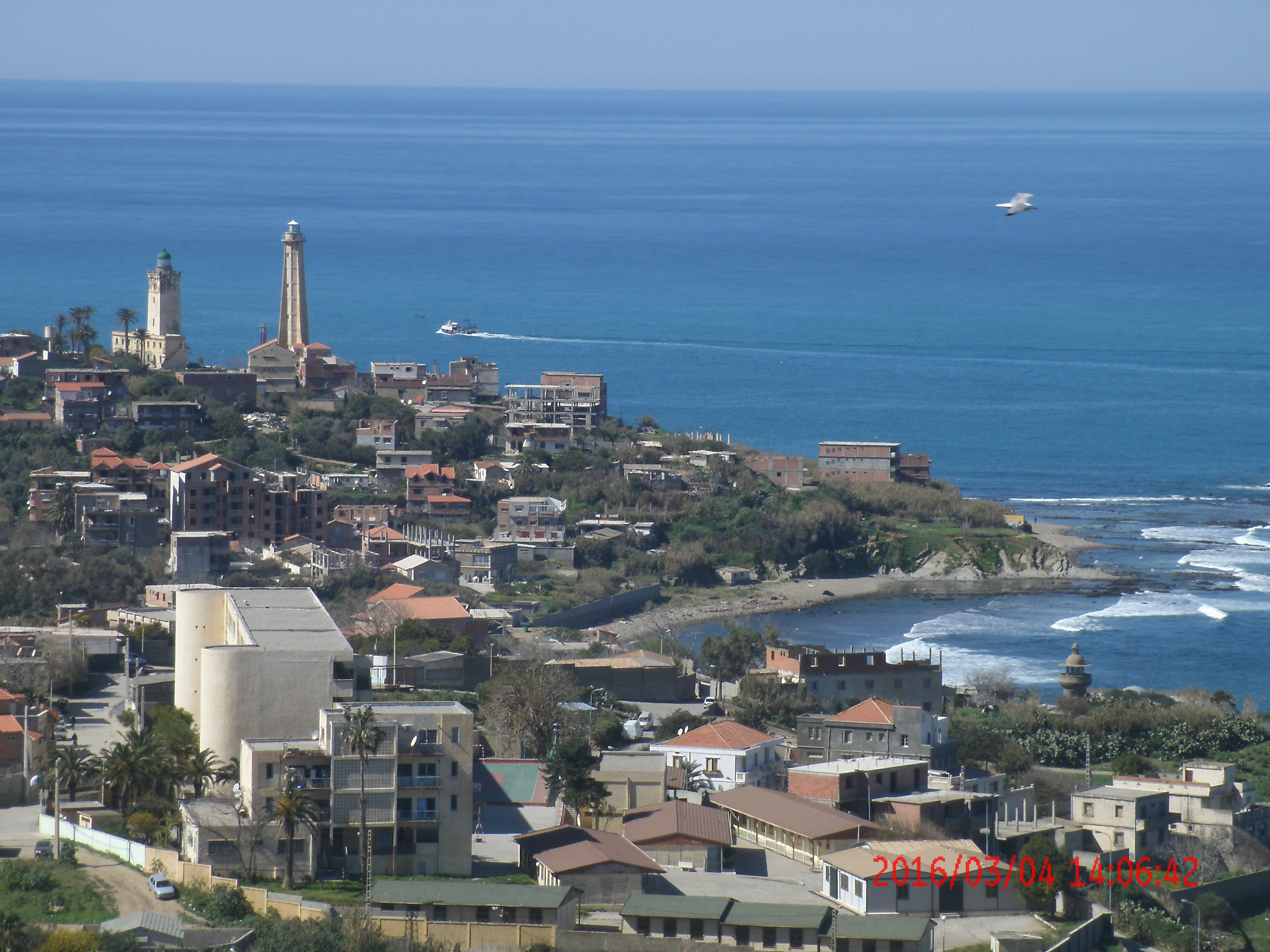
City of Dellys

He was promoted on 1 March 1831 to the rank of corvette captain of first class in the French navy.

== Assault of Dellys (1837) ==
Félix-Ariel d'Assigny commanded the assault of 30 May 1837 against the city of Dellys after the first insurrection of Kabylia against the colonial power located in the Casbah of Algiers.

== Commandant of the Marine (1839) ==
He was promoted on 29 March 1839 to the rank of Commandant of the Marine Corps in the brig named "Dragon" stationed at Mediterranean Sea within Algeria coast.

== Oran Station ==
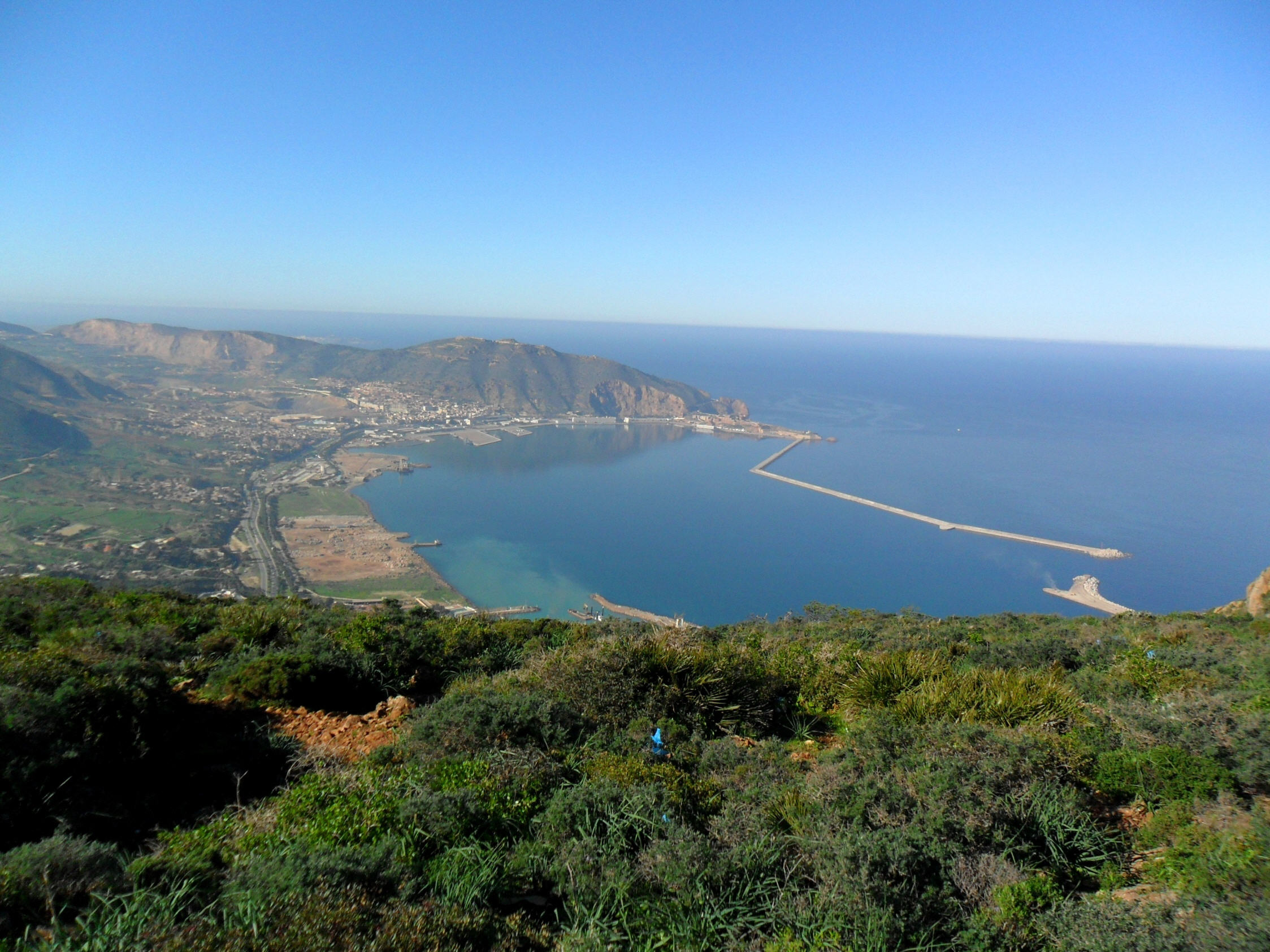
Mers El Kébir

Félix-Ariel was appointed in 1839 as commander of the naval base of Oran in the port of Mers El Kébir where he served under the tutelage of General Hyacinthe de Bougainville (1781-1846).

He was maintained by King Louis Philippe I at the Oran naval base until 20 May 1841 as a corvette captain in command of the brig Le Dragon when he was replaced by Captain Joseph-Marie-Eugène Degenès on this ship.

== Nautical commission (1843) ==
He was then appointed on 1843 by the colonial power as president of the nautical commission of the French navy in Algeria.

This Algerian nautical commission was created in 1843 and its mission was to draw up improvement projects for the ports of the Algerian coast.

The chairman of this commission was Corvette captain d'Assigny, and was made up of two naval officers and a secretary hydrograph engineer, to whom were added in each port the Ingénieur des ponts et chaussées, the chief engineer and the port manager.

== Acting Commander ==
He was promoted on 13 September 1843 to the rank of Acting Commander (French: Commandant supérieur) of the French Navy.

The then Governor General of Algeria, Thomas Robert Bugeaud (1784-1849), then by decree entrusted Felix-Ariel with the provisional command of the French navy in Algeria.

Indeed, the death on 13 September 1843 of the then commander of the colonial navy in Algeria, Counter admiral Fauré (d. 1843), had thus prompted the appointment of Félix-Ariel as his replacement in this strategic military post.

== Awards ==
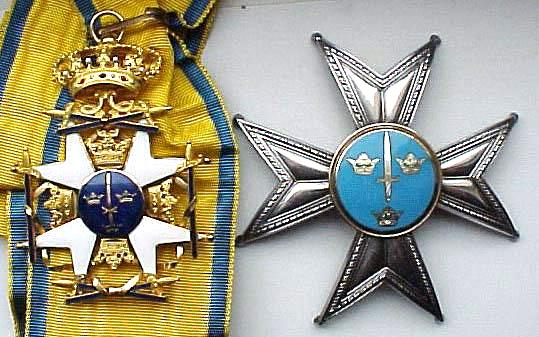
Order of the Sword

Félix-Ariel d'Assigny was decorated with several medals during his military career, including:

- Knight of the Order of the Sword: He was decorated with this medal by King Charles XIV John on 4 March 1841 as a reward for having saved the Swedish ship Gothenburg in the coast of Oran.
- Officer of the Legion of Honour: He was awarded this medal after being appointed captain of the frigates of the Marine Royale.

== Death ==
Félix-Ariel d'Assigny died in the town of Toulon during the year 1846 after a long career in the French navy.

== Gallery ==
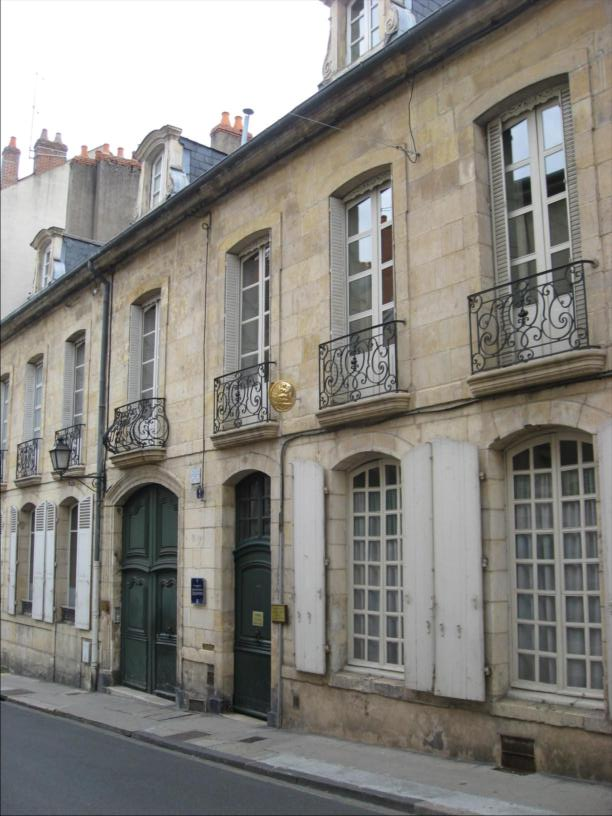
Family house of the Flamen d'Assigny in Nevers

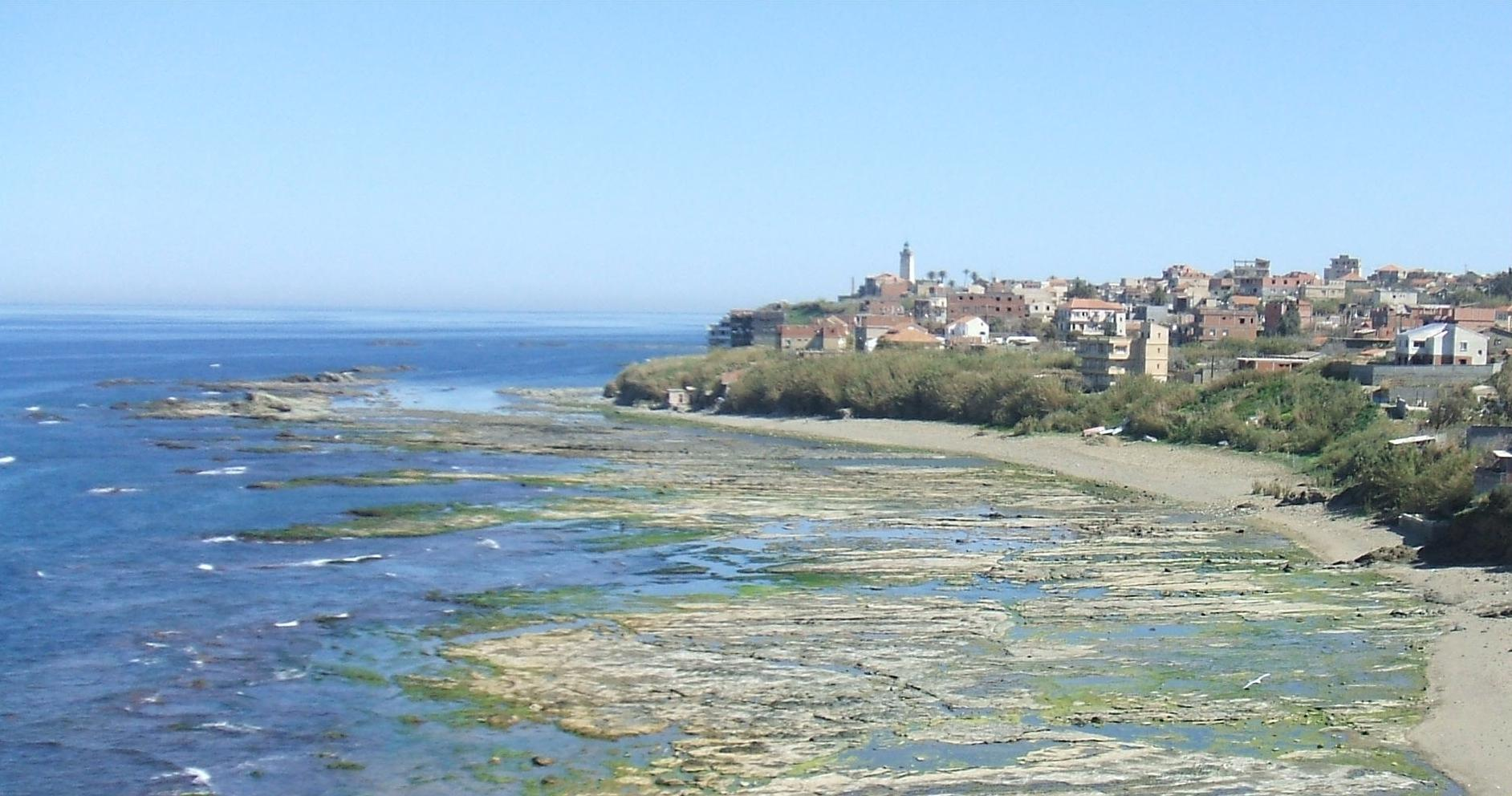
Shipwreck of Dellys (1830)

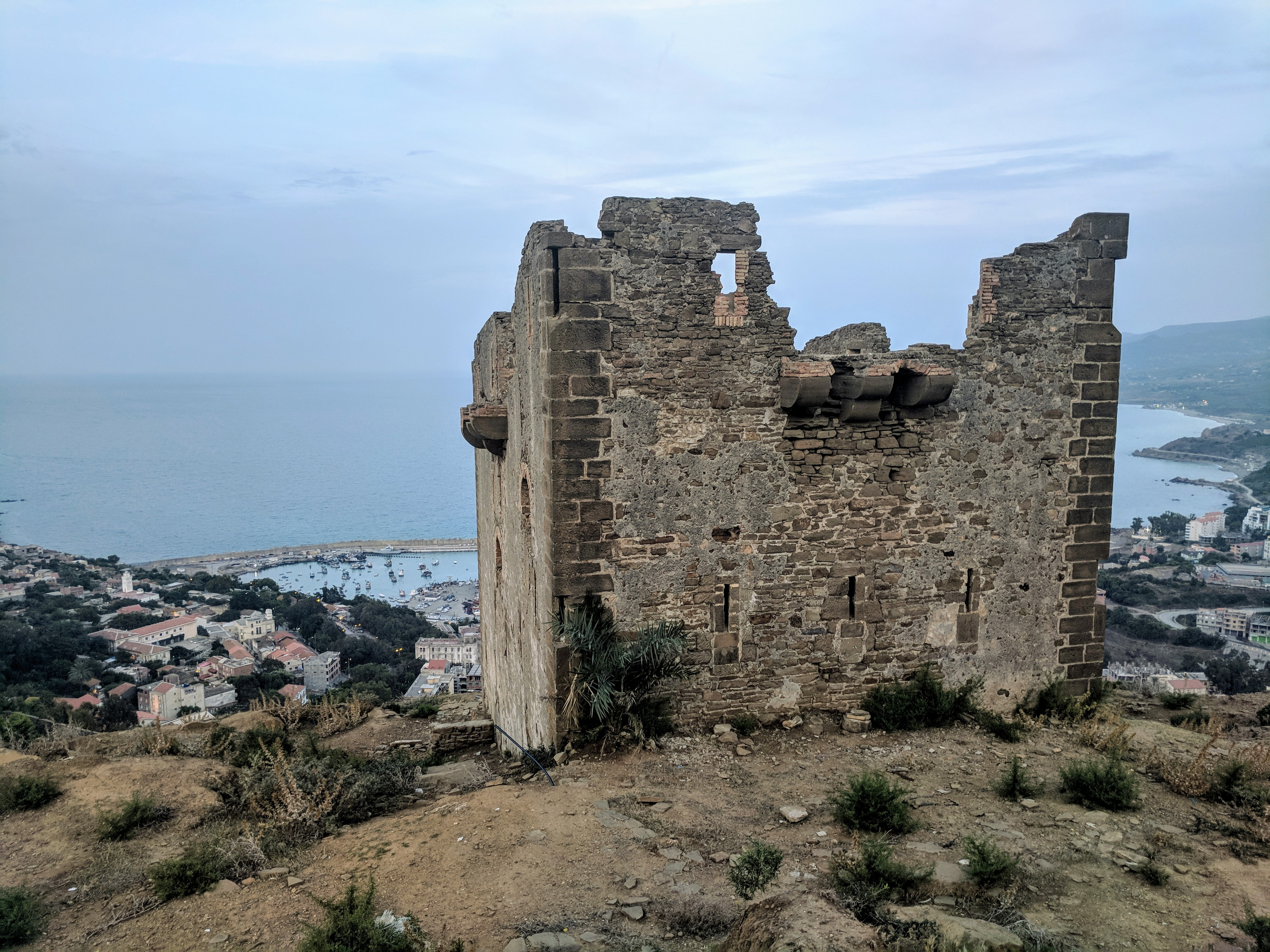
First Assault of Dellys (1837)

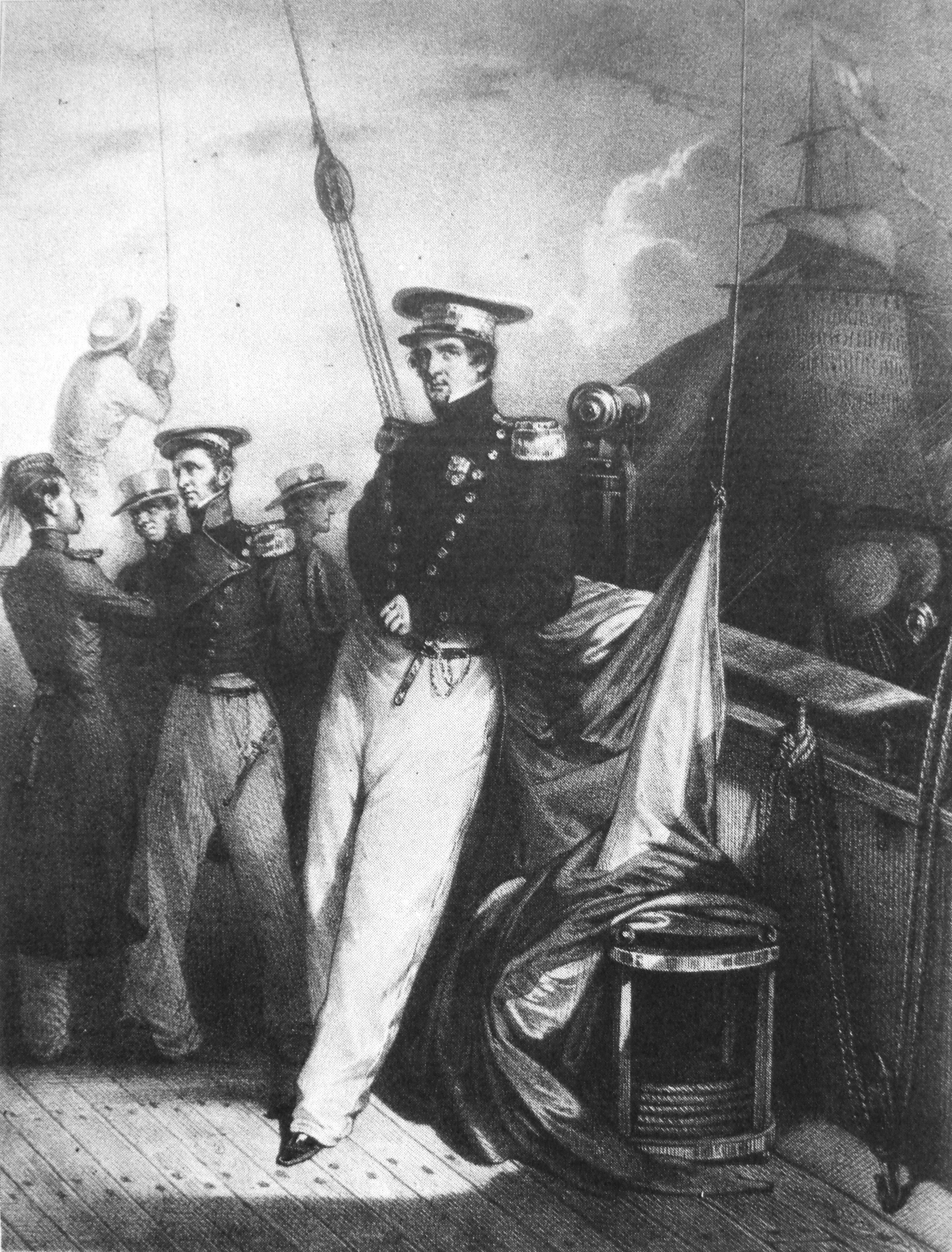
Hyacinthe de Bougainville

== See also ==
- French conquest of Algeria
- Armand Joseph Bruat
- Hyacinthe de Bougainville
- Shipwreck of Dellys (1830)
- First Assault of Dellys (1837)

== Bibliography ==
- M. Bajot (1831). Annales maritimes et coloniales, Volume 2. Paris: Imprimerie Royale. p. 613.
- La conquête d'Alger en 1830: poème en trois chants. Paris: G. A. Dentu, Imprimerie-Librairie. 1832. p. 76.
- Ministère de la marine et des colonies (1840). État général de la Marine et des colonies au 1er janvier 1840. Paris: Imprimerie Royale. p. 63.
- Léon Galibert (1843). Histoire de l'Algérie ancienne et moderne. Paris: Furne et Cie, Libraires-Éditeurs. p. 475.
- M. Bajot, M. Poirré (1844). Annales maritimes et coloniales, Volume 29. Paris: Imprimerie Royale. p. 204.
- M. Bajot, M. Poirré (1846). Annales maritimes et coloniales, 31e Année, 3e Série. Paris: Imprimerie Royale. p. 975.
- Edmond Pellissier de Reynaud (1854). Annales algériennes, Volume 2. Paris: Librairie Militaire. p. 180.
- Victor Bérard (1867). Indicateur général d'Algérie. Algiers: Bastide, Libraire-Éditeur. p. 185.
- Ferdinand-Philippe d'Orléans (1870). Campagnes de l'armée d'Afrique, 1835-1839. Paris: Michel Lévy Frères. p. 282.
- Société Historique Algérienne (1875). Revue africaine, Numéros 109 à 120. Algiers: Adolphe Jourdan, Libraire-Éditeur. p. 209.
- Société Historique Algérienne (1876). Revue africaine, Volume 20. Algiers: Adolphe Jourdan, Libraire-Éditeur. p. 209.
- Institut français de la mer (1877). La Revue maritime, Volume 54. Paris: Berger-Levrault et Cie, Éditeurs. p. 140.
- Ludovic de Magny (1878). Le nobiliaire universel, Volume 13. Paris: Direction des Archives de la Noblesse. p. 46.
- Charles Marie Denis Damrémont (1927). Correspondance du général Damrémont. Paris: H. Champion, Libraire-Éditeur. p. 191.
- Georges Benoit-Guyod (1960). Bruat, amiral de France. Paris: A. Bonne, Éditeur. p. 220.
