= Medina quarter =

Old city section found in many North African cities

A medina (from Arabic: مدينة, romanized: madīnah, lit. 'city') is a historical district in a number of North African cities, often corresponding to an old walled city. The term comes from the Arabic word simply meaning "city" or "town".

== Historical background ==
Prior to the rise and intrusion of European colonial rule in North Africa, the region was home to many major cities which had long been centres of culture, commerce, and political power over many centuries.

In Algeria, the French conquest that began in 1830 and brought the country under colonial control resulted in significant destruction of the urban fabric of its historic cities. Colonial rule also led to the dismantling of many traditional urban institutions, the disruption of local culture, and even a certain level of depopulation over time. Fewer cities have preserved their pre-colonial urban fabric in Algeria by comparison with neighbouring countries, but significant remains have been preserved in historic cities such as Algiers, Tlemcen, Nedroma, and Constantine, as well as in many Saharan towns. In Algiers, most of the historic lower town was demolished and remodeled along European lines after the French conquest. The only part of the old city that remained relatively untouched was the upper town, which contained the citadel (qasaba) and the former residence of the rulers, and thus became known as the "Casbah" of Algiers.

The fate of traditional walled cities in Tunisia and Morocco, which also came under French colonial rule over the next hundred years, was quite different. The French conquest of Tunisia took place in 1881 and resulted in the establishment of a French "Protectorate", while nominally retaining the existing Tunisian monarchy. In Tunisia the French generally built new planned cities (the Villes Nouvelles) outside the established historic cities. These new planned towns were almost exclusively inhabited by European colonists while the indigenous population predominantly resided in the old districts, resulting in a certain level of racial segregation during the colonial period. Some French assimilationist policies, as witnessed in Algeria, were also implemented in Tunisia. In Tunis, the old city was preserved but it was physically linked with the European town, making it easier to police, while its traditional economic and administrative systems were marginalized, rendering it dependent on the European districts. The most important preserved historic towns or medinas today include those of Tunis, Kairouan, Mahdia, Sfax, and Sousse.

In Morocco, the Treaty of Fes established another French Protectorate over that country in 1912. The first French resident general in Morocco, Hubert Lyautey, appointed Henri Prost to oversee the urban development of cities under his control. One important colonial policy with long-term consequences was the decision to largely forego development of existing historic cities and to deliberately preserve them as sites of historic heritage, the "medinas". The French administration again built new planned cities outside the old walled cities, where European settlers largely resided with modern Western-style amenities. This was part of a larger "policy of association" adopted by Lyautey which favoured various forms of indirect colonial rule by preserving local institutions and elites, in contrast with other French colonial policies favouring assimilation. The desire to preserve historic cities was also consistent with one of the trends in European ideas about urban planning at the time which argued for the preservation of historic cities in Europe – ideas which Lyautey himself favored. Scholar Janet Abu-Lughod has argued that French urban policies and regulations created a kind of urban "apartheid" between the indigenous Moroccan urban areas – which were forced to remain stagnant in terms of urban development – and the new planned cities which were mainly inhabited by Europeans and expanded to occupy rural lands outside the city which were formerly used by Moroccans. This separation was partly softened by wealthy Moroccans who started moving into the Villes Nouvelles during the colonial period.

== List of medinas ==
=== Algeria ===
- Casbah of Algiers, a medina named after its fortress
- Casbah of Dellys
- Tlemcen

=== Libya ===
- Derna
- Ghadames
- Gharyan
- Hun
- Murzuk
- Tripoli
- Waddan
- Tazirbu
- Benghazi

=== Morocco ===
- Asilah
- Casablanca
- Chefchaouen
- Essaouira
- Fes el Bali, the first medina of Fes (considered one of the largest car-free urban areas in the world)
- Fes Jdid, the second medina of Fes
- Marrakesh
- Meknes
- Rabat
- Salé
- Tangier
- Taroudant
- Taza
- Tétouan

=== Tunisia ===
- Tunis
- Kairouan
- Monastir
- Sfax
- Sousse
- Tozeur
- Hammamet
- Nabeul
- Gafsa
- El Kef
- Béja
- Mahdia
- Bizerte
- Gabès
- Djerba

== Gallery ==
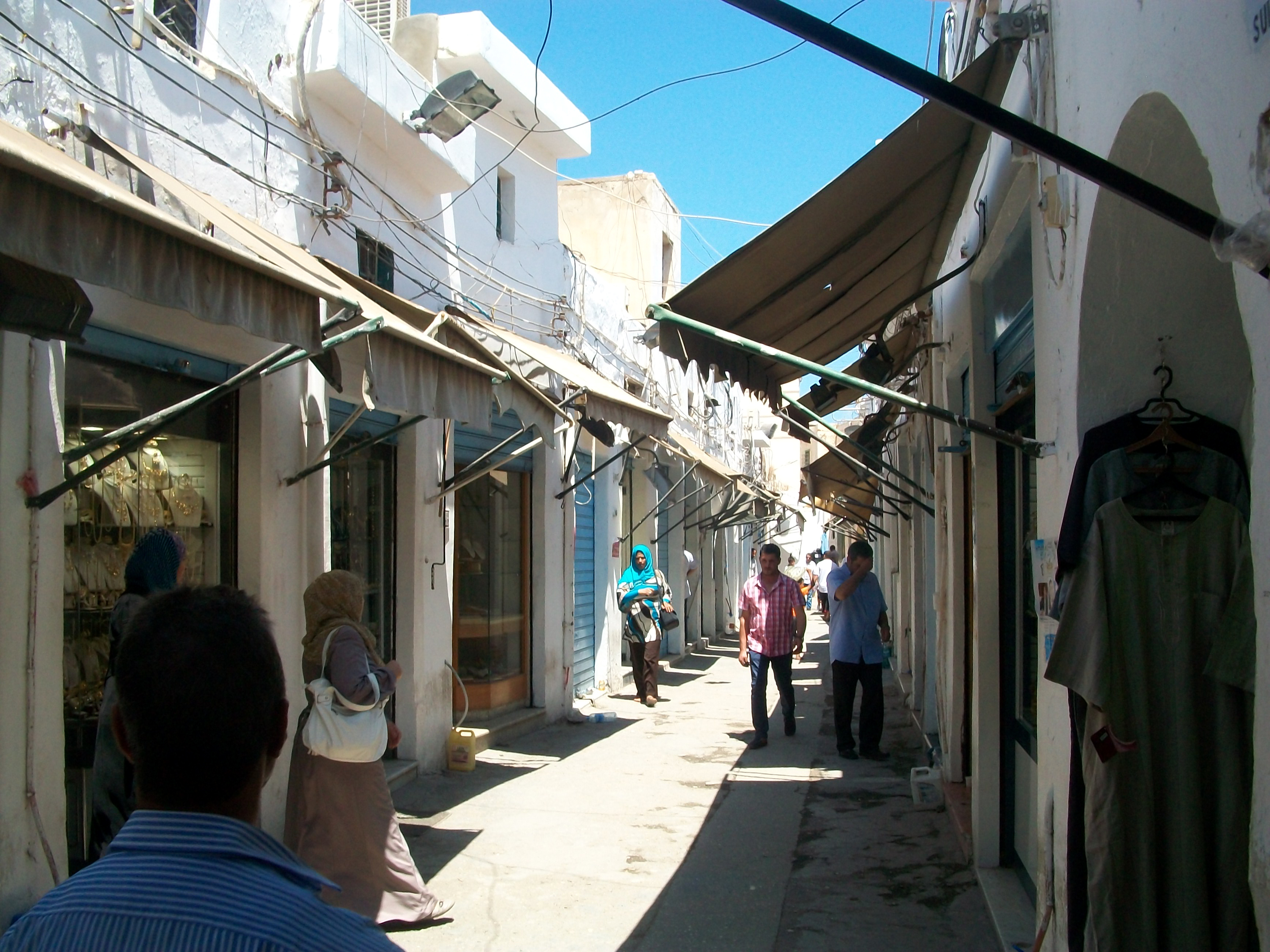
Medina in Tripoli, Libya

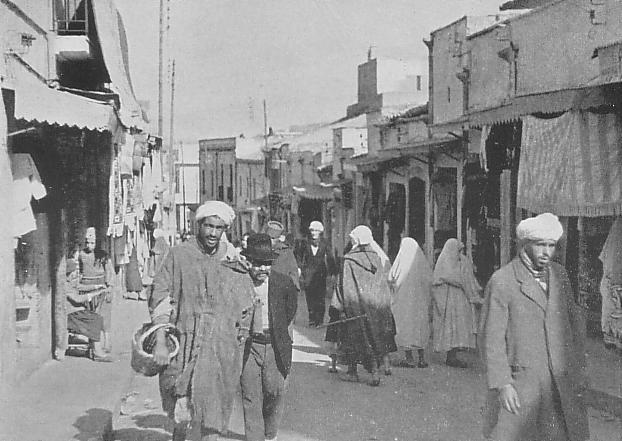
View of the medina of Tlemcen, Algeria

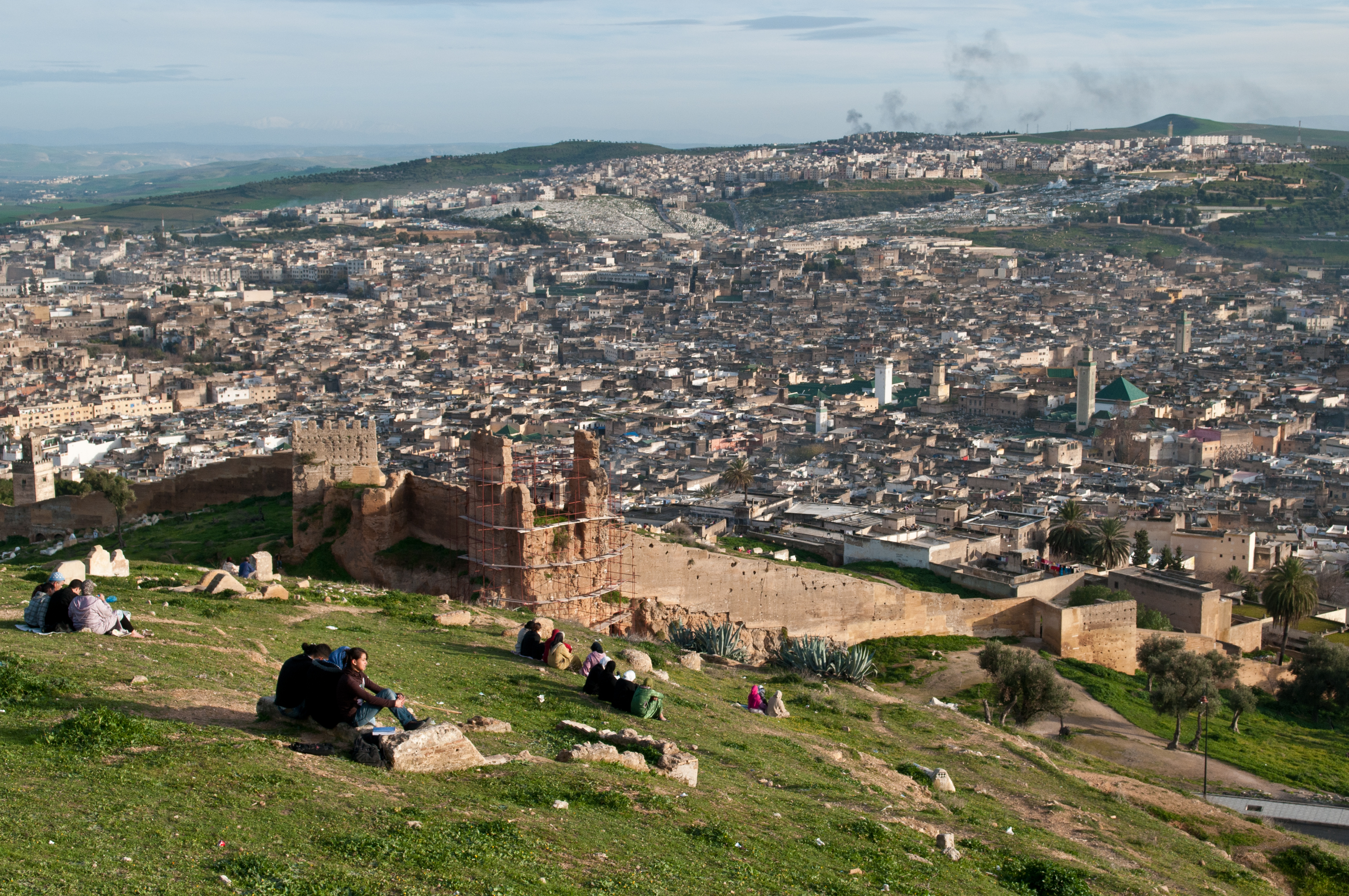
View of the medina (old city) of Fez, Morocco

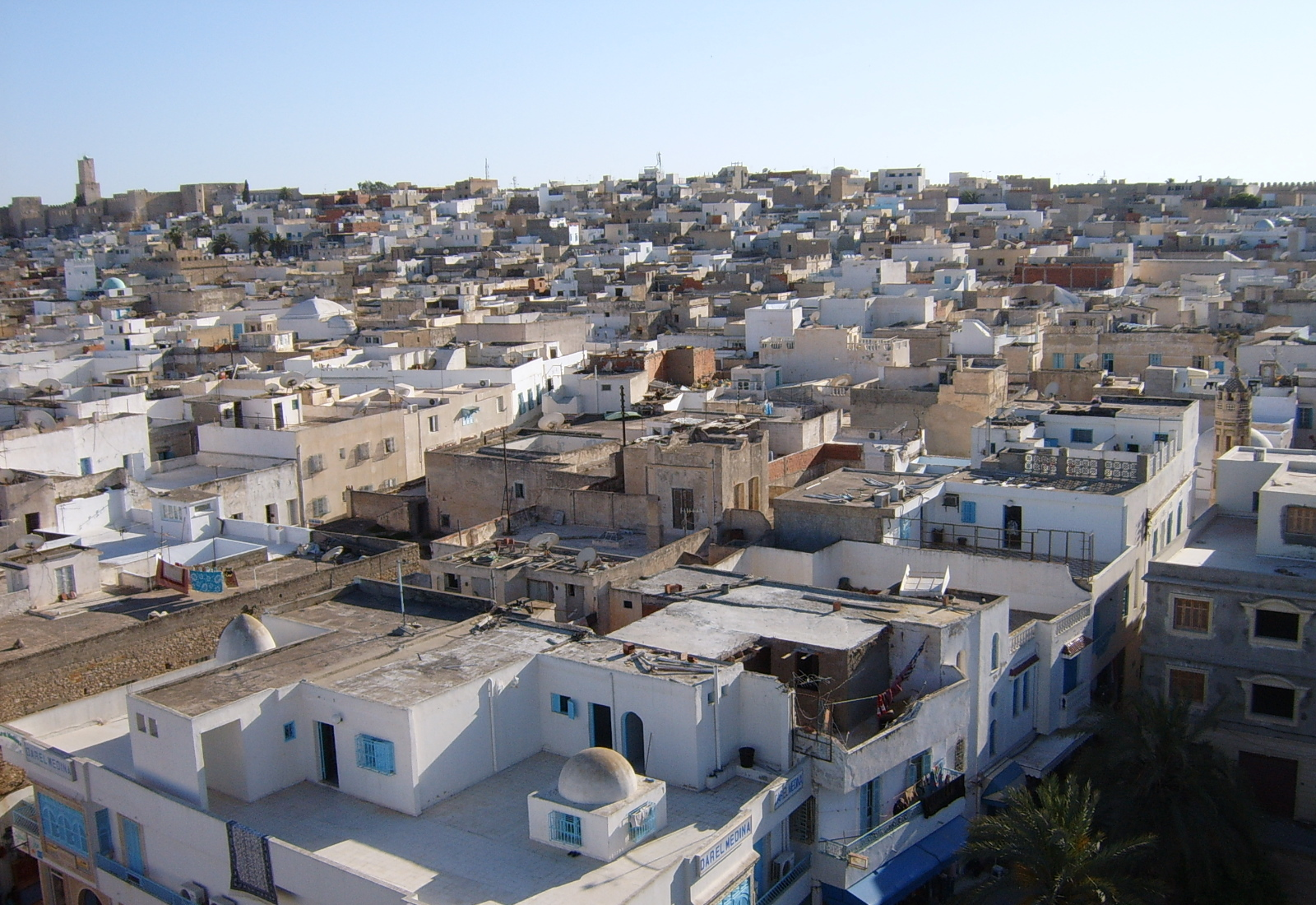
View of the medina of Sousse, Tunisia

== See also ==
- Altstadt
