= Larbaâ Nath Irathen District =

- District
- Country: Algeria
- Province: Tizi Ouzou Province
- Chief town: Larbaâ Nath Irathen

Area
  - Total: 33.49 sq mi (86.73 km^{2})

Population (2008)
  - Total: 46,831
  - Density: 1,400/sq mi (540/km^{2})
- Time zone: UTC+1 (CET)

The Larbaâ Nath Irathen is an Algerian administrative district in the Tizi-Ouzou province and the region of Kabylie . Its chief town is located on the common namesake of Larbaâ Nath Irathen.

== Communes ==
The district is composed of three communes:

- Ait Aggouacha;
- Irdjen;
- Larbaâ Nath Irathen.

The total population of the district is 46 831 inhabitants for an area of 86.73 km2.

== Localisation ==
District borderings of the Larbaâ Nath Irathen are Tizi Rached, Mekla, Ain El Hammam, Beni Yenni, Beni Douala and Tizi Ouzou.
