= Azazga =

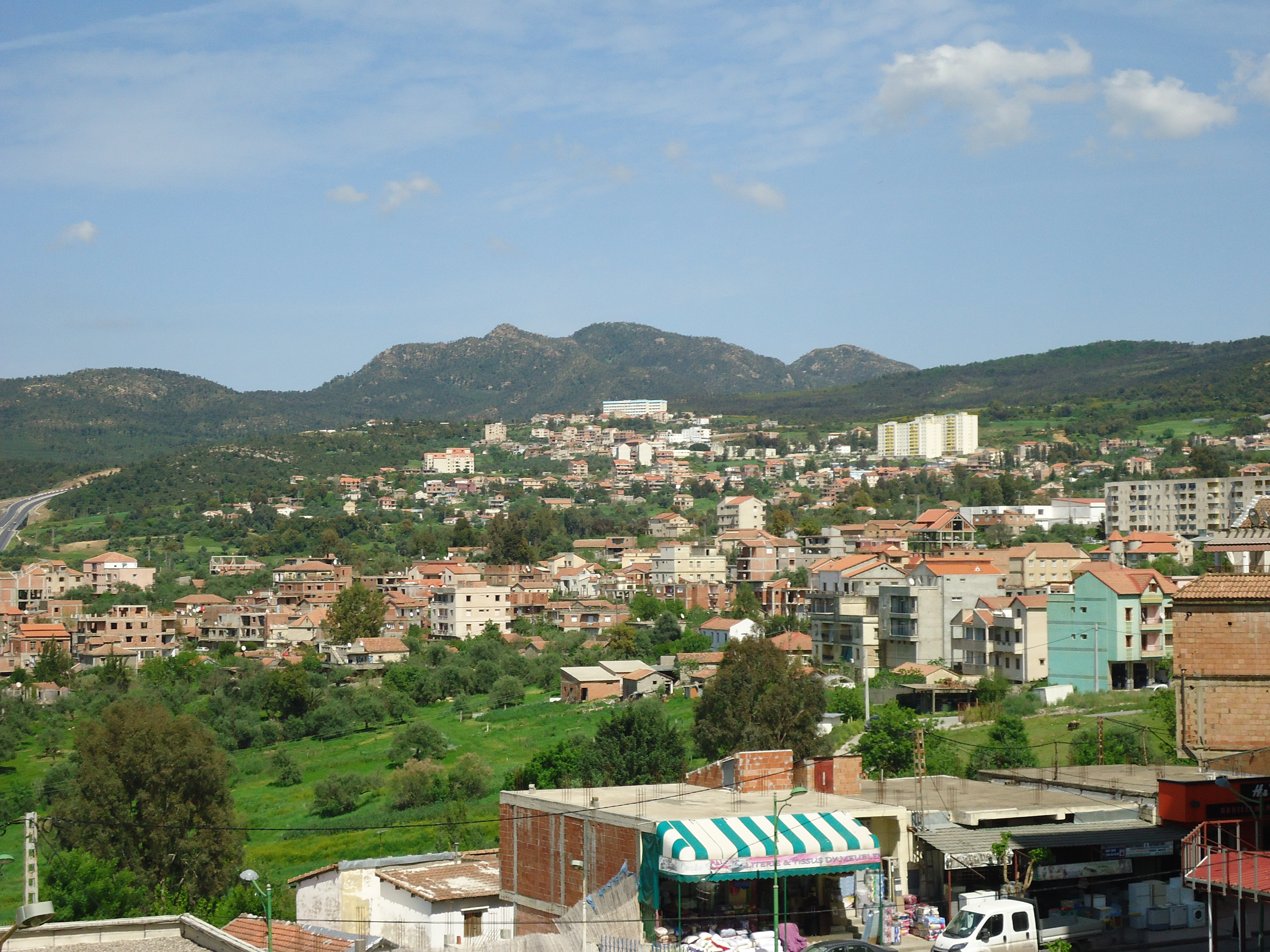
- Azazga

- Location of Azazga within Tizi Ouzou Province

- Location in Algeria
- Coordinates: 36°44′43″N 4°22′16″E
- Country: Algeria
- Province: Tizi Ouzou Province
- District: Azazga District

Area
  - Total: 78.57 km^{2} (30.34 sq mi)

Population (2008)
  - Total: 34,683
- Time zone: UTC+1 (CET)
- Climate: Csa

Azazga (Kabyle: Iɛeẓẓugen, Arabic: عزازقة), is a town in the Tizi Ouzou Province in northern Algeria. It is the third largest Kabyle city, after Béjaïa and Tizi Ouzou. It is the district seat of the so-named Daïra. The population in 2008 was 34,683.

== History ==
Azazga is a rich locality by its culture and its history. It was created under the French occupation in 1882. It was the chief town of the canton of the commune of Haut-Sébaou. In Kabyle, its name means "the deaf persons", a name which would have been given to the inhabitants of the village by the French at the time of colonization. It is said that one day, the inhabitants refused to hear French troops passing near the village and who asked them to locate rebels; from this came the name of the village.

The inhabitants of Azazga are very attached to their freedom. They played a very important role at the time of the Algerian War of Independence, of which Chekini Mohand Said of the village of Rabta was a leader on November 1, 1954, and in 1963 during the revolts against the Algerian state of that time. Later he became a prefect until his retirement. In the same way during the riots of the Black Spring in 2001 where nearly 126 died and more than 5000 wounded and led to closing and the destruction of barracks of Gendarmerie after one year of quarantine.

Azazga was built on a marshy ground named "ilmathen" (ilmaten meaning swamp), which was the source of drained water, and until 1962 many fountains were built in the city.

The inhabitants of this commune knew many waves of emigration towards the Middle East. For this reason many Kabyles hearths today are found in Syria, the countries situated near Syria, Lebanon, New Caledonia and Guyana.

== Sport ==
The football team of Azazga, Jeunesse Sportive Azazga or JSA, is one of the oldest clubs of Algeria. Founded in 1946, this club did not play in the Premier League for a long time. The other team of the area is OC Azazga, which was created in 1998 in Cheurfa, and is now better classified than the JSA. In June 2008, Ighil Bouzel created a new club, Union Sportive Azazga (USA). It began in the 2008/09 season with its Brazilian behavior (blue and yellow).

Jeunesse Sportive Azazga is also made up of several sections of boxing, volleyball, athletics, karate.

The district is further divided into 5 municipalities:

- Azazga
- Freha
- Ifigha
- Yakouren
- Zekri
