= Tizi N'Tleta =

Tizi N'Tleta Acif Boulma
- Commune and town
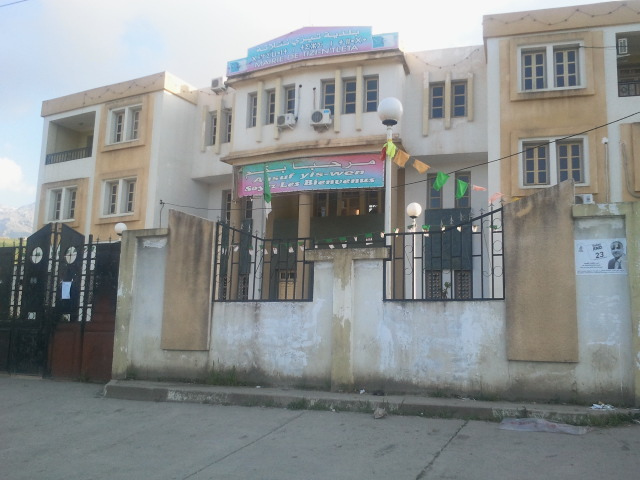
- Town Hall

- Commune Location in the Tizi Ouzou wilaya.

- Location within Algeria
- Country: Algeria
- Province: Tizi Ouzou Province
- Time zone: UTC+1 (CET)

Tizi N'Tleta (formerly: Acif Boulma) is a town and commune in Tizi Ouzou Province in Kabylie (northern Algeria).

== History ==
It was in Ighil Imoula, one of the villages of Tizi N'tleta, that thousands of copies of the proclamation of November 1, 1954 that began the Algerian revolution were printed.

== Geography ==
=== Location ===
Tizi N'Tleta is in the south of Tizi Ouzou Wilaya province and is bordered by Beni Douala, Ouadhia, Aït Bouaddou, Assi Youcef, Mechtras, and Souk El Thenine.

=== Villages of the commune ===
Since its foundation, Tizi N'Tleta has been composed of nine villages:

- Tizi N'Tleta
- Tighoza Athmane
- Ighil ImoulaVill
- Aït El Hadjali
- Aït Ouali
- Aït Abeed ait
- Maghzel Mal Tassoukit
- Ighil Naït Chila
- Tadert Oufella
