= Tizi Ouzou District =

- District
- Country: Algeria
- Province: Tizi Ouzou Province
- Chief town: Tizi Ouzou

Area
  - Total: 39.52 sq mi (102.36 km^{2})

Population (2008)
  - Total: 135,088
  - Density: 3,400/sq mi (1,320/km^{2})
- Time zone: UTC+1 (CET)

The Tizi Ouzou district is an Algerian administrative district in Tizi Ouzou Province and the region of Kabylia. Its chief town is located on the eponymous town of Tizi Ouzou.

== Communes ==
The daira is composed of only one commune: Tizi Ouzou.

The total population of the district is 135 088 inhabitants for an area of 102.36 km2.

== Localisation ==
Districts bordering the Tizi Ouzou District are Ouaguenoun, Azazga, Tizi Rached, Larbaâ Nath Irathen, Beni Douala, Maatkas, Draâ Ben Khedda and Draâ Ben Khedda.

== Notable people ==
- Mohamed Belhocine, Algerian medical scientist, professor of internal medicine and epidemiology.
