= Battle of Ath Yahia Moussa =

1959 Battle in Kabylia, Algeria

- Part of Algerian War
Date	6–7 January 1959
Location	Aït Yahia Moussa, Algeria
Result	ALN victory

Belligerents
ALN	France

Commanders and leaders
Colonel Amirouche	(France) Jacques Faure

Casualties and losses
Algerian claims: 385 killed	

The Battle of Ath Yahia Moussa was an armed conflict during the Algerian War that took place on January 6, 1959, in the Kabylia region of Algeria. This battle involved the National Liberation Army (ALN) against the French Army.

== Background ==
On January 6, 1959, a meeting of several regional leaders of the National Liberation Army (ALN) was supposed to take place at the residence of Krim Belkacem's family in the village of Tizra-Aissa. The French Army, informed of this meeting, deployed a military force with the objective of eliminating the ALN troops, including the four companies from Djurdjura, Maatkas, Ath Yahia Moussa, and Lakhdharia, as well as a commando of 25 men from the autonomous zone of Tizi-Ouzou. On January 5, there were multiple reports of French troops in the Aït Yahia Moussa area, leading to an evacuation order. The main leaders were to be safely evacuated to a secure location.

== Battle ==
The battle commenced on January 6 around 3 a.m. in the village of Tizra-Aissa. The first aerial bombardment occurred at 10 a.m., and the fighting persisted throughout the day, concluding on the morning of January 7 after the French army retreated. However, the toll was substantial on both sides, with the Algerian Liberation Army losing 385 of its fighters. Captain Jean Graziani, who was the one who tortured Djamila Bouhired, also met his death during a hand-to-hand combat with the mujahideen.

== Aftermath ==
During the course of the battle, the French army experienced the loss of two officers, Captain Jean Graziani and Lieutenant Jean Chassin.
