= Boghni District =

- District

- Location within Algeria
- Country: Algeria
- Province: Tizi Ouzou Province
- Time zone: UTC+1 (CET)

Boghni District is a district of Tizi Ouzou Province, Algeria.

The district is further divided into 4 municipalities:

- Assi Youcef
- Boghni
- Bounouh
- Mechtras
