= Azeffoun =

- Commune and town
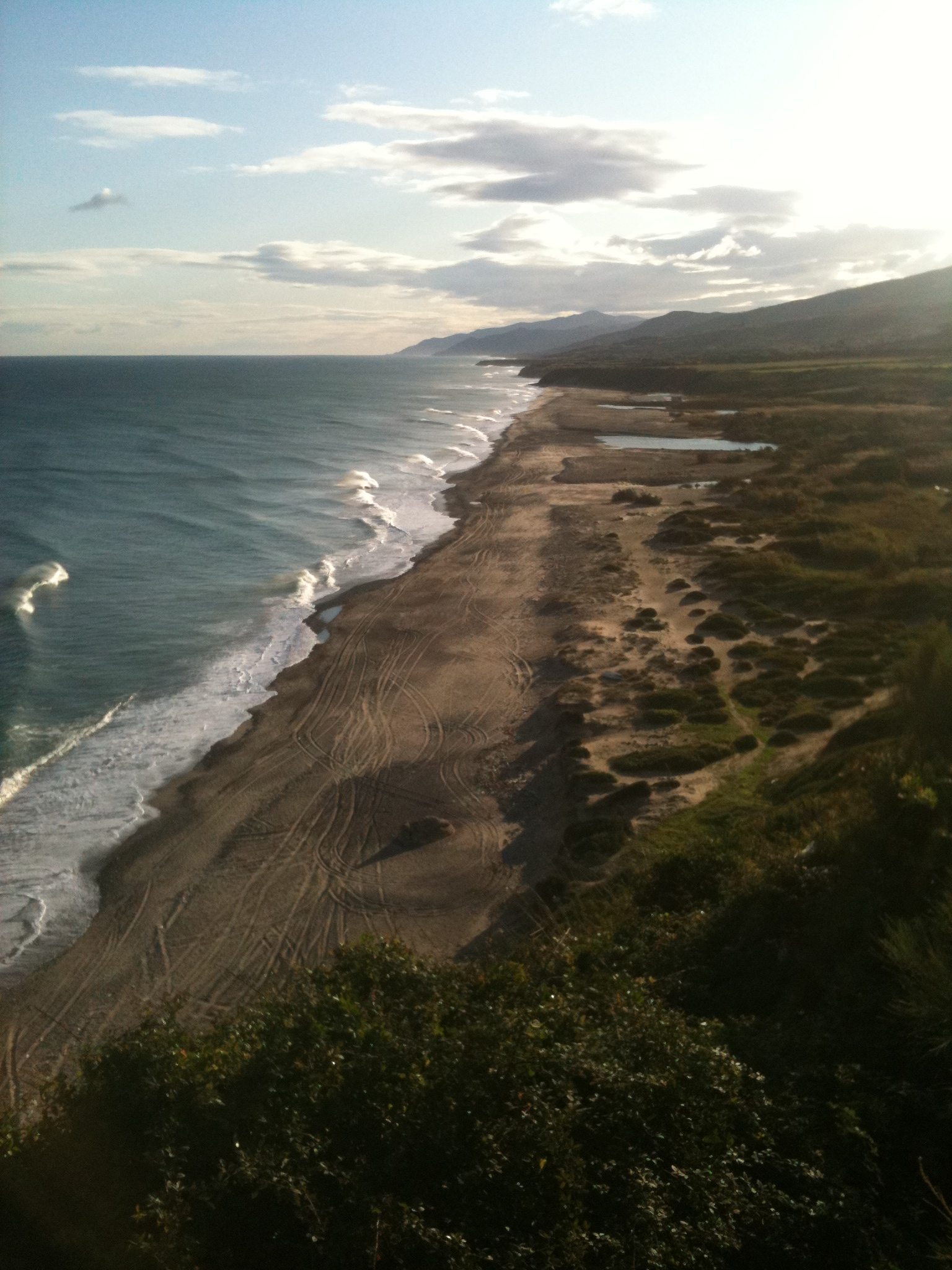

- Location within Algeria
- Coordinates: 36°54′N 04°25′E
- Country: Algeria
- Province: Tizi Ouzou
- Time zone: UTC+1 (CET)
- Cap Corbelin Lighthouse
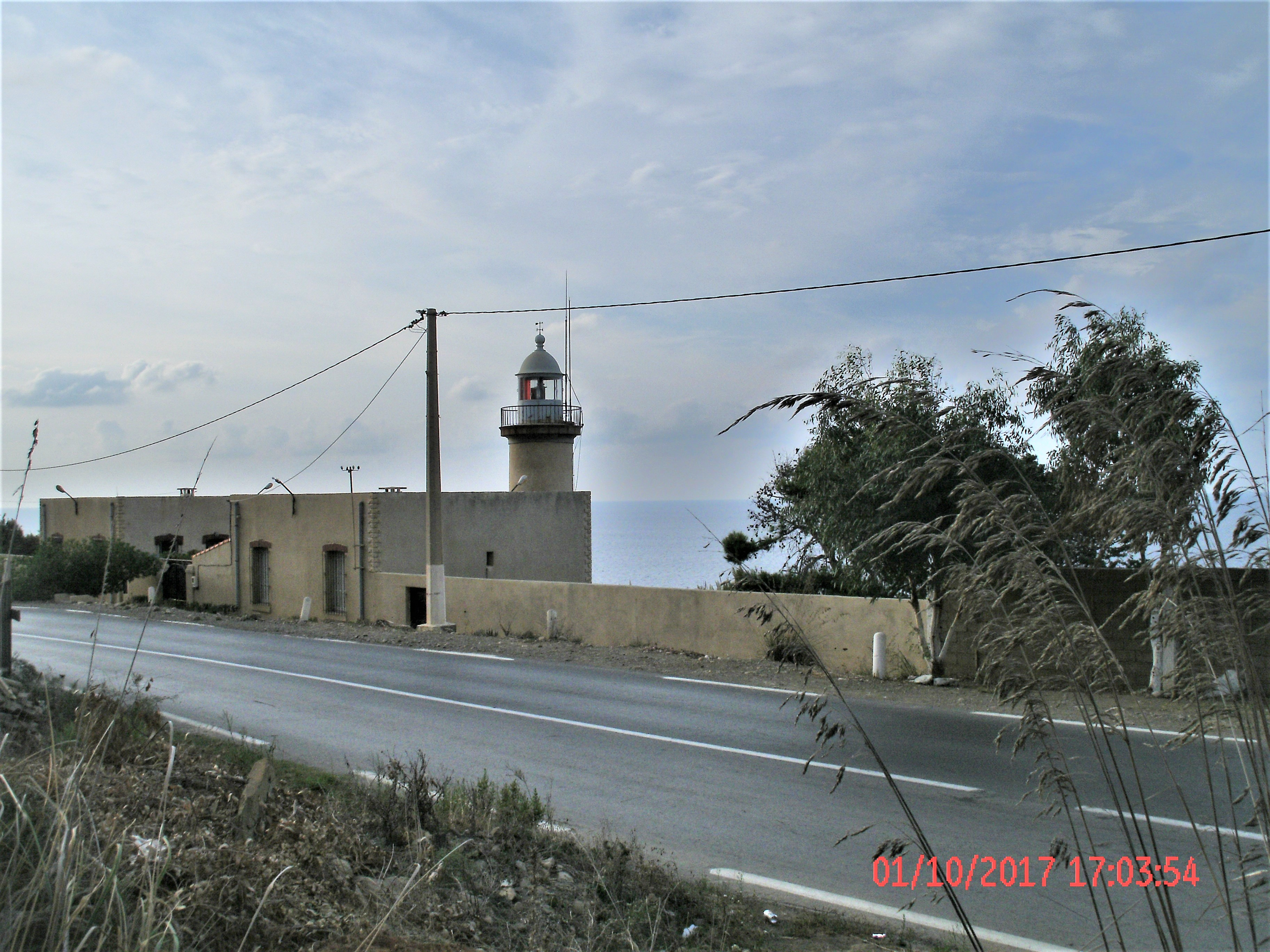
- Constructed: 1905
- Foundation: masonry base
- Construction: masonry tower
- Height: 16 m (52 ft)
- Shape: cylindrical rower with balcony and lantern
- Markings: white tower, grey lantern
- Operator: Office Nationale de Signalisation Maritime
- Focal height: 42 m (138 ft)
- Light source: main power
- Range: 22 nmi (41 km; 25 mi)
- Characteristic: Fl (2+1) WR 15s.

Azeffoun, the classical Rusazus and colonial Port Gueydon, is a town and commune in Tizi Ouzou Province in northern Algeria, located on Cape Corbelin 64 km (40 mi) north-east of Tizi Ouzou. The economy of the town of Azeffoun is based on tourism, fishing, and agriculture.

== Geography ==
The area of the municipality of Azeffoun is 126.66 km^{2} (49 sq mi). Mount Tamgout, the cliffs to its south, rise about 500 m (1,600 ft). It had a population of 16,096 inhabitants in 1998 and 17,435 inhabitants in 2008.

Azeffoun is bounded by the Mediterranean on the north, the town of Aït Chafâa on the east, and the common Akerrou, Aghrib in the south and Iflissen in the west. The town is located 64 km (40 mi) north-east of Tizi Ouzou and 83 km (52 mi) western of Béjaïa.

=== Villages in the commune of Azeffoun ===
- Iagachene
- Tiouidiouine
- At Rhuna (Ait Rhouna)
- Cheurfa
- At Lḥusin (Ait Lhocine)
- Iḥanucen (Ihanouchene)
- Tazaɣart (Tazaghart)
- Amriɣ (Amrigh)
- At Sidi Yeḥya (Ait Sidi Yahia)
- Nath Ouaissa (Ait Ouaissa)
- Mlaṭa Iɛeggacen (M'latta Iagachene)
- Mlaṭa (Mlatta cité)
- Isumaten (Issoumatene)
- Zituna (Zitouna)
- Tiza
- Lxibya (El Khibia)
- At Yillul (Ait Illoul)
- Kanis
- Tala Ḥadid
- Iɛbac (Iabache)
- Tagemunt n Yeɛbac (Taguemount Iâvache)
- Ɛcuba (Achouba)
- At Warẓiq (Ait Ouarzik)
- At Wandlus (Ait Ouandelous)
- Tifrest
- At Naɛim (Ait Naiem)
- Ijanaten (Idjanaten)
- Qirya (Kiria)
- Azeffun
- Bezerqa (Bezerka)
- Iḥemziwen (Ihamziouene)
- Iberhuten (Iberhoutene)
- Imuluden (Imouloudene)
- Tagemunt n Wedrar (Taguemount Boudrar)
- Lqelɛa (El Kelâa)
- Tidmimin
- Ɣerru (Gherrou)
- Iɣil Leɣzel (Ighil Leghzel)
- Taẓebbujt n Tiza (Tazebojt n Tiza)
- Imidiqsen (Imidiksen)
- Laɛzib Saḥel (Lazib Sahel)
- Agni n Riḥan (Agouni n Rihane)
- Taɛinṣert (Taincert)
- Tifezwin (Tifezouine)
- Timluka (Timlouka)
- Aɣulid (Aghoulid)
- Sidi Qurci (Sidi Korchi)
- Cote Bitar
- Ait chaffa
- Tafraout
- Ighil Mehni
- Jemha
- Tagarcifth

== History ==
The Phoenicians and Carthaginians established a fortress south of Cape Corbelin as part of their chain of colonies between the Strait of Gibraltar and their homelands. They named the cape and its settlement ršz (Phoenician: 𐤓𐤔𐤆, "Cape of the Fort").

The town fell under Roman hegemony after the Punic Wars. Under Augustus, the town was notionally refounded as a Roman colony, receiving the name Rusazus Colonia Augusti to honor its imperial benefactor. The Roman-era bishopric continues as a Catholic titular see.

Under colonial rule, Port Gueydon—named after a French admiral and colonial administrator—was built on a nearby hillside in the last third of the 19th century.

== Personalities linked to the commune ==
- Taleb Abderahmane
- Tahar Djaout
- Fellag
- Ali Haddad
- Hadj M'hamed El-Anka
- Hadj M'Rizek
- Boudjemaâ El Ankis
- Mohamed Iguerbouchène
- M'hamed Issiakhem
- Mohamed Ifticene
- Abderrahmane Aziz
- Bachir Hadj Ali
- Ahcéne Lalmas
- Younes Ifticene
- Mohamed Hilmi
- Said Hilmi
- Hnifa Boualem Chaker
- Abdelkader Chercham
- Abderrahmane Lounés
- Rouiched
- El Hadj-Said Oulmaghechthoum
- Hamid Tagziria
- Rouiched

== See also ==
- List of lighthouses in Algeria
