= Bouzeguène District =

Coordinates: 36.6167°N 4.4798°E

- District
- Interactive map of Bouzeguène District
- Country: Algeria
- Province: Tizi Ouzou Province
- Time zone: UTC+1 (CET)

Bouzeguène District is a district of Tizi Ouzou Province, Algeria.

The district is further divided into 4 municipalities:

- Beni-Zekki
- Bouzeguene
- Idjeur
- Illoula Oumalou
