= Ait Bouada =

- Village
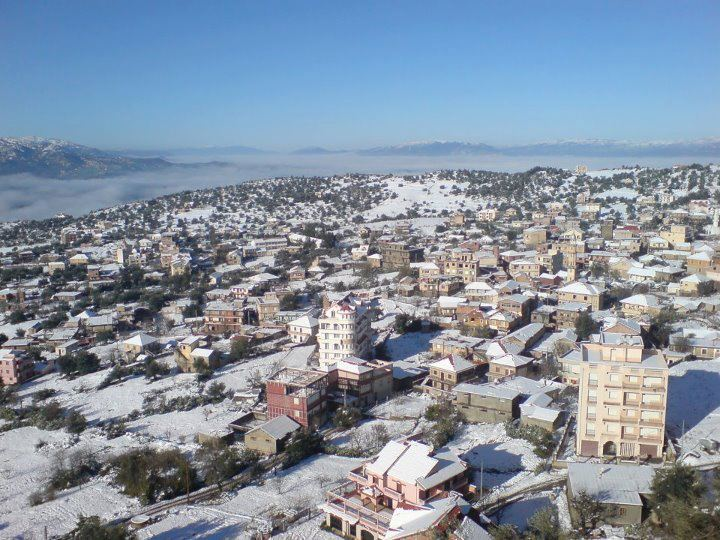
- Ait Bouada under the snow

- Location in Algeria
- Coordinates: 36.6977°N 4.4098°E
- Country: Algeria
- Province: Tizi Ouzou Province
- District: Azazga District
- Commune: Azazga
- Postal code: 15312

Ait Bouada (Kabyle: At Buɛḍa) is a town in north central Algeria. The town is located in Kabylie, about 130 kilometres east of Algiers. Ait Bouada is at an elevation of ~500 meters (~1650 ft).

== Population ==
Its inhabitants are predominantly Sunni Muslims and speak Kabyle as their first language.

== History ==
The town was mentioned by the French as early as 1846

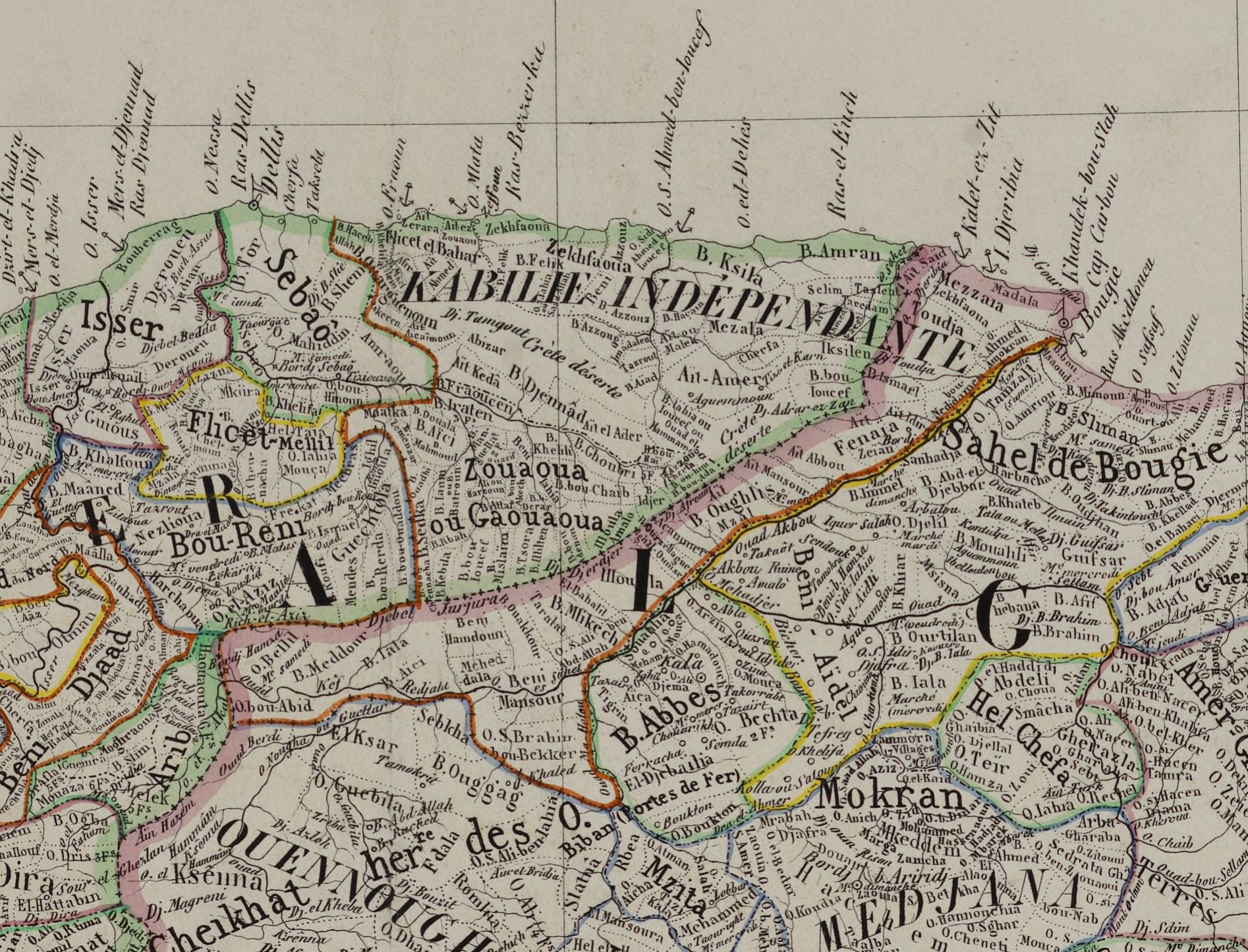
1846. The name of the town was spelled as B. Bou Ada

Following the colonisation of Algeria by the French, a lot of its inhabitants fled the region to Syria.
