= Makouda District =

Coordinates: 36.7909°N 4.0669°E

- District
- Country: Algeria
- Province: Tizi Ouzou Province
- Time zone: UTC+1 (CET)

Makouda District is a district of Tizi Ouzou Province, Algeria.

The district is further divided into 2 municipalities:

- Boudjima
- Makouda
