= Tigzirt District =

- District
- Country: Algeria
- Province: Tizi Ouzou Province
- Chief town: Tigzirt

Area
  - Total: 64.24 sq mi (166.38 km^{2})

Population (2008)
  - Total: 35,742
  - Density: 560/sq mi (215/km^{2})
- Time zone: UTC+1 (CET)

The Tigzirt district is an Algerian administrative district in the Tizi-Ouzou province and the region of Kabylie . Its chief town is located on the eponymous namesake of Tigzirt.

== Communes ==
The district is composed of three communes:

- Iflissen;
- Mizrana;
- Tigzirt.

The total population of the district is 35,743 inhabitants for an area of $166.38 km^2$.
