= Maâtka District =

Coordinates: 36.6121°N 3.9878°E

- District
- Country: Algeria
- Province: Tizi Ouzou Province
- Time zone: UTC+1 (CET)

Maâtka District is a district of Tizi Ouzou Province, Algeria.

The district is further divided into 2 municipalities:

- Mâatkas
- Souk El Thenine
