= Tizi Ghenif District =

- District
- Location within Algeria
- Coordinates: 36°35′21″N 3°46′04″W
- Country: Algeria
- Province: Tizi Ouzou Province

Area
  - Total: 41.07 km^{2} (15.86 sq mi)

Population (2008)
  - Total: 29,409
- Time zone: UTC+1 (CET)
- Postal code: 15480

Tizi Ghenif District is a district of Tizi Ouzou Province, Algeria.

The district is further divided into 2 municipalities:

- M'Kira
- Tizi Ghenif
