= Rally for Kabylia =

Rally for Kabylia: Kabyle: Agraw i Tamurt n Iqbayliyen; French: Rassemblement pour la Kabylie
- Abbreviation: ATI (Kabyle); RPK (French)
- Leader: Hamou Boumedine
- Spokesperson: Hamou Boumedine
- Founder: Militants of the Kabyle Manifesto
- Founded: February 24, 2017
- Ideology: Kabyle autonomism Regionalism
- Colors: Blue; Orange
- Slogan: Pour une Kabylie autonome dans une Algérie plurielle et démocratique ('For an autonomous Kabylia in a plural and democratic Algeria')

The Rally for Kabylia (Kabyle: Agraw i Tamurt n Iqbayliyen, French: Rassemblement pour la Kabylie) is a Kabyle autonomous party founded on 24 February 2017, following the political convention held the same day at Arous, Ait Oumalou in the Tizi Ouzou Province.

== History ==
=== Background ===
The movement was founded by militants of the Kabyle Manifesto. The Kabyle Manifesto is a text written for the constitutional recognition of a special political for the region of Kabylia.

== Ideology ==
The Rally for Kabylia advocates for the recognition by the Algerian government of a special status for Kabylia, as well as a regional government and parliament.

It also advocates for the preservation of the Kabyle identity and the promotion of the Kabyle language and culture.
