= Bouzeguene =

Bouzeguene بوزغن
- Commune and town
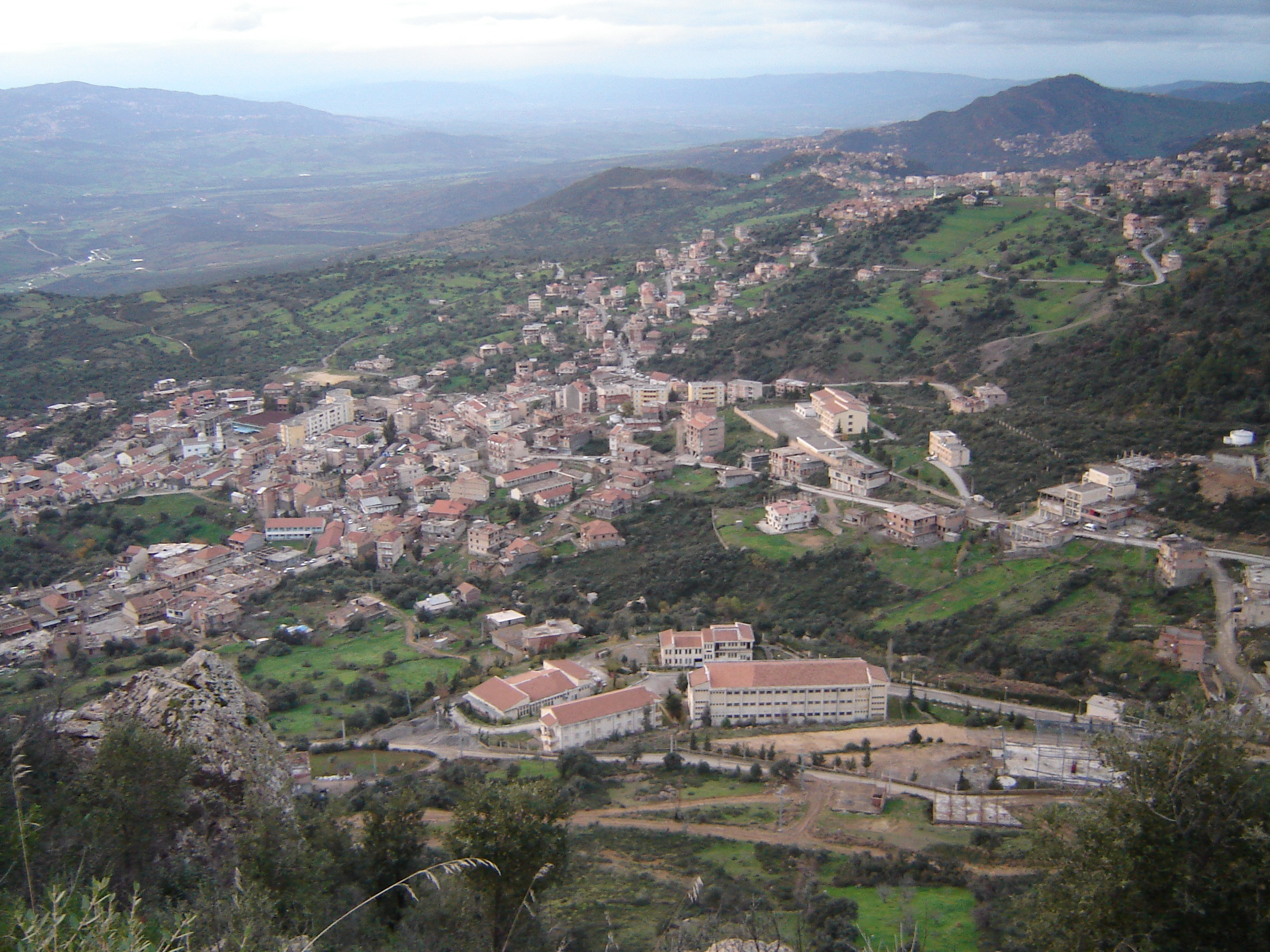
- Bouzeguene

- Location within Algeria
- Coordinates: 36.6167048°N 4.4798498°E
- Country: Algeria
- Province: Tizi Ouzou Province
- District: Bouzeguene District

Area
  - Total: 66.9 km^{2} (25.8 sq mi)

Population (2008)
  - Total: 24,311
- Time zone: UTC+1 (CET)
- CP: 15327

Bouzeguene (alternatively Wizgane) is a Kabyle town in Tizi Ouzou Province, Algeria, approximately 170 km from Algiers.

The village of Bouzeguene is located in the center of the commune of Bouzeguene and surrounded by around twenty other villages. The commune is at 60 km east of Tizi-Ouzou and borders the Béjaïa Province with the mountains of Ait Zikki with the Col de Chellata, and the Daira of Ighzer Amokrane. All the goods come from Akbou and Tazmalt.

Bouzeguene is known for its high number of emigrants in different parts of the world. This is especially true of France, as a majority of locals left to seek for a job under the French occupation.

Bouzeguene was also the cradle of the resistance against the French occupation and the birthplace of Colonel Mohand Oulhadj who fought the French Army from the 1950s until the independence of Algeria in 1962.

== Demographics ==
The population of Bouzeguene is formed of twenty one families who cohabit in the same order of respects and ran by a committee of imgharen tadarth who have meetings especially on Fridays to take care of the village's plans and issues.
