= Draâ Ben Khedda District =

Coordinates: 36.7349°N 3.9556°E

- District
- Interactive map of Draâ Ben Khedda District
- Country: Algeria
- Province: Tizi Ouzou Province
- Time zone: UTC+1 (CET)

Draâ Ben Khedda District is a district of Tizi Ouzou Province, Algeria.

The district is further divided into 4 municipalities:

- Draâ Ben Khedda
- Sidi Nâamane
- Tadmaït
- Tirmitine
