= Tala Athmane =

Village in Tizi Ouzou, Algeria

Coordinates: 36.7264°N 4.1703°E

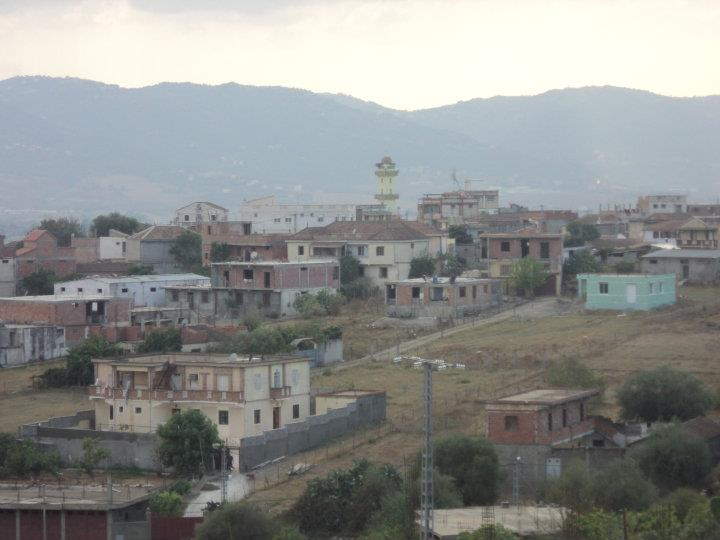
Tala Athmane as seen from the highest lands of the village

Tala Athmane (in Kabyle language : Tala Σetman ⵝⴰⵍⴰ ⵄⴻⵝⵎⴰⵏ, in Arabic : ثالة عثمان) is a small village situated 15 km east of Tizi Ouzou, Algeria. It lies at 300m elevation. The village's postal code is 15144 (formerly 15007).

== Topography ==
Tala Athmane is divided into 5 areas:

1. La zone contains the Souq, an important source of financial revenue for the village. The Mayouf youth hostel also lies in this area;
2. Thazmalt badda, the down village;
3. Thaddarth ufella, the up village, is the most important part of the village. It contains the mosque, built between 1979 and 1982;
4. Ighil ufella, the up hill; and
5. La cité (the city) is the newest part of the village, having been added after the end of the Algerian War.

== Public institutions ==
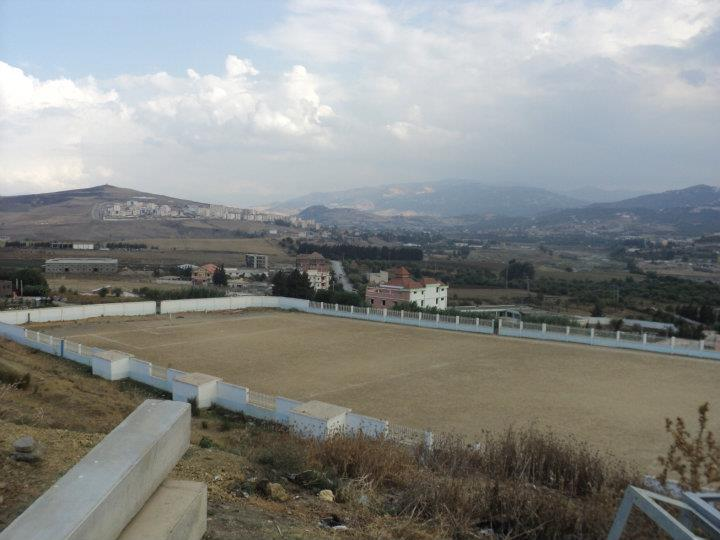
Stadium of Tala Athmane

Tala Athmane has:

- An elementary school les frères Moula
- A middle college Amar Boubkeur
- A post office (15144)
- A football stadium,
- A sport room (Karaté and kick-boxing)
- A health center.

== History ==
=== Before the independence of Algeria ===
During the 30s, Tala Athmane was relatively can lived, The City, Ighil Ouffella, Thadoukkarth were at the time vast fields, certain ploughed by seasons in season, the other grounds served as pastures for the cattle. generations ago, the villagers lived in simple houses, built with stalks of vegetables, the walls were covered with mud, the most sophisticated houses were stone buildings, provided with a Kabyle roof in traditional tiles, people began their activities early in the morning, most, just after the morning prayer. The life was globally hard and continuously, for the men and the women, as well as for the young children.

=== During the Algerian War ===
From the release of the revolution in 1954, a meeting was held in Makouda, under the presidency of lieutenant Amar Bessalah, Said "El Bass", representatives of all the sector Ouaguenoun, and Makouda contributed at this meeting. Tala Athmane was represented by his (her) persons in charge, Mr. Moula Ali (Ali Ouammar) and Mr. Benziane Mouhammed (Rebbat), who were in charge of leading a financial collection, for the National Liberation Front (FLN). Mr. Kacher Arezki was named head of the front, who in his turn chosen the members who are going to help him in the spots, he so named : Gaoua Hend, Benziaane Md (Rebbat), Djemâa Akli, Khiar Amar, Chertouha Arezki, Guettab Ali. Their mission consisted essentially in collecting contributions, but also in getting back weapons (hunting guns, pistols), in announcing political information, and to insure the safety and security of the former (ancient) resistance fighters, during them meetings and travel. At the beginning of year 1955, Tala Athmane used to be a real moving plate of diverse products, it is by this village that passed in transit food, clothes and medicines, intended for the civil and for the moudjahidines through all the wilaya N 3.

=== After the Independence ===
Just after the independence, the inhabitants started to reconstruct more modern houses (brick, iron bars, industrial cement) so, the place in the center of the village called (THALA), was set up in 1963, The mosque of the village, was built between 1979 and 1982, the villagers used to pray in a stone house, rather wide, lacks windows, another house served as mosque for the women.

As of 1982, right after the construction of the mosque Athmane ibn affane ended, 5 imams worked in the village :

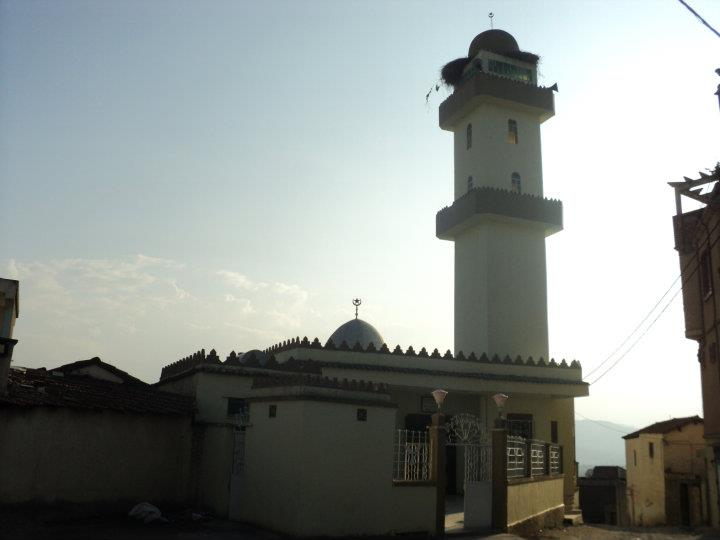
The mosque of Tala Athmane

1. Imam Lounis (5 months)
2. Imam Tahar (1 year and a half)
3. Imam Lounis (10 months)
4. Imam Ali: native of Ighil Zekri, he was the imam of the village for more than 20 years, until his pension.
5. Imam Arezki: comes from Timizart, he exercises his activities since 2004

On August 31, 2008, the money collection in the mosques of tizi ouzou gained more than 1.550.000 DZD by the religious association of the mosque named thagmat (Brotherhood)

== Leptospirosis infection ==
In the beginning of December 2006 and the infection of water caused 6 cases of Leptospirosis where a young male died. The villagers started panicking due to lack of information and the absence of authority. There were, therefore, no studies in the place, and not even one ambulance to take the sick to the hospital. After a couple of weeks, a disinfection service intervened, and the disease disappeared.

== Election of a new committee of the village ==
in October 2011, a meeting was held in the elementary school, to vote for the new members of the committee of the village. in November 2011, the committee handles 11 projects, such as: gutters, water purification, new electric lines for the isolated homes, tarring of roads, arrangement of both cemeteries...

== Sport ==
Tala Athmane has a sport association named USTA Union Sportive De Tala Athmanewhich includes different sports: The president of the association is Mr Houhech Arezki.

Tala Athmane is in phase of renew and of expansion.
