= Ouacif District =

Coordinates: 36.5245°N 4.2039°E

- District
- Interactive map of Ouacif District
- Country: Algeria
- Province: Tizi Ouzou Province
- Time zone: UTC+1 (CET)

Ouacif District is a district of Tizi Ouzou Province, Algeria.

The district is further divided into 3 municipalities:

- Aït Boumahdi
- Aït Toudert
- Ouacifs
