= Banu (Arabic) =

Arabic word meaning "the descendants of"

Banū (بنو) or Banī (بني) is Arabic for 'the children of' or 'descendants of' and appears before the name of a tribal progenitor. Another example of the usage is the Bani Quraish, the tribe from which Muhammad came, for which a Quranic Surah is also named.

== Grammar ==
For example, "Bani Kaab" literally means the sons of Kaab: the house of Kaab. Due to the Arabic grammar rules, the word can sometimes become "Bani" depending on the context. For example, it is "Banu Kaab's language", but "belongs to the Bani Kaab". Sometimes, it's "Banis".

An alternative transliteration of "Bani" is Banee, or vernacular Beni (Béni in French transliterations).

The word itself is derived from the same root as the patronymic particle "ibn" or "bin".

== Uses ==
"Bani Israel" is a common Arabic word for the children of Israel; a Quranic chapter is named so. The term itself is very close to its Hebrew counterpart: B'nei Yisrael' (בני ישראל) (also B'nai Yisrael, B'nei Yisroel or Bene Israel).

Other than tribes, persons can have the words in their name, Fatima bint Hizam was nicknamed Umm Baneen, "mother of many sons".

Another use is the phrase Banu Adam, denoting all the children of Adam. Since Adam is considered the first man in the Abrahamic religions, Banu Adam means "Humankind". "Bin Adam" (son of Adam) or "Bint Adam" (daughter of Adam) is used as a term for a "human being," especially when reminding or admonishing people to "act like human beings" (i.e. respect rules of politeness and propriety).

"Banu" is the plural of the word "Ibn" or "Bin", which means "Son of". Paternal lineage was clearly identified in Arab history as a sign of good or bad standing. All names were followed by "Bin" (male) or "Bint" (female) and the name of the father.

As a form of Arabization, the word Beni has often been used in official place names or personal names instead of Berber names such as Ath, Ayt and so on. For instance, Beni Yénni or Béni Ourtilane are nowadays the administrative names of Algerian districts called At Yenni and Ayt Wartiran by their inhabitants.

== See also ==
- Bantu
- Tribes of Arabia
