= Tizi Rached District =

Coordinates: 36.6787°N 4.2086°E

- District
- Country: Algeria
- Province: Tizi Ouzou Province
- Time zone: UTC+1 (CET)

Tizi Rached District is a district of Tizi Ouzou Province, Algeria.

The district is further divided into 2 municipalities:

- Aït Oumalou
- Tizi Rached
