= Mekla District =

Coordinates: 36.6876°N 4.2681°E

- District
- Interactive map of Mekla District
- Country: Algeria
- Province: Tizi Ouzou Province
- Time zone: UTC+1 (CET)

Mekla District is a district of Tizi Ouzou Province, Algeria.

The district is further divided into 3 municipalities:

- Aït Khelili
- Mekla
- Souamâa

== Notable people ==
- Essaïd Belkalem - Professional football player
