= Tizi Ouzou Province =

Province of Algeria

Tizi Ouzou Province Tawilayt n Tizi Wezzu ولاية تيزي وزو Wilaya de Tizi Ouzou
- Province
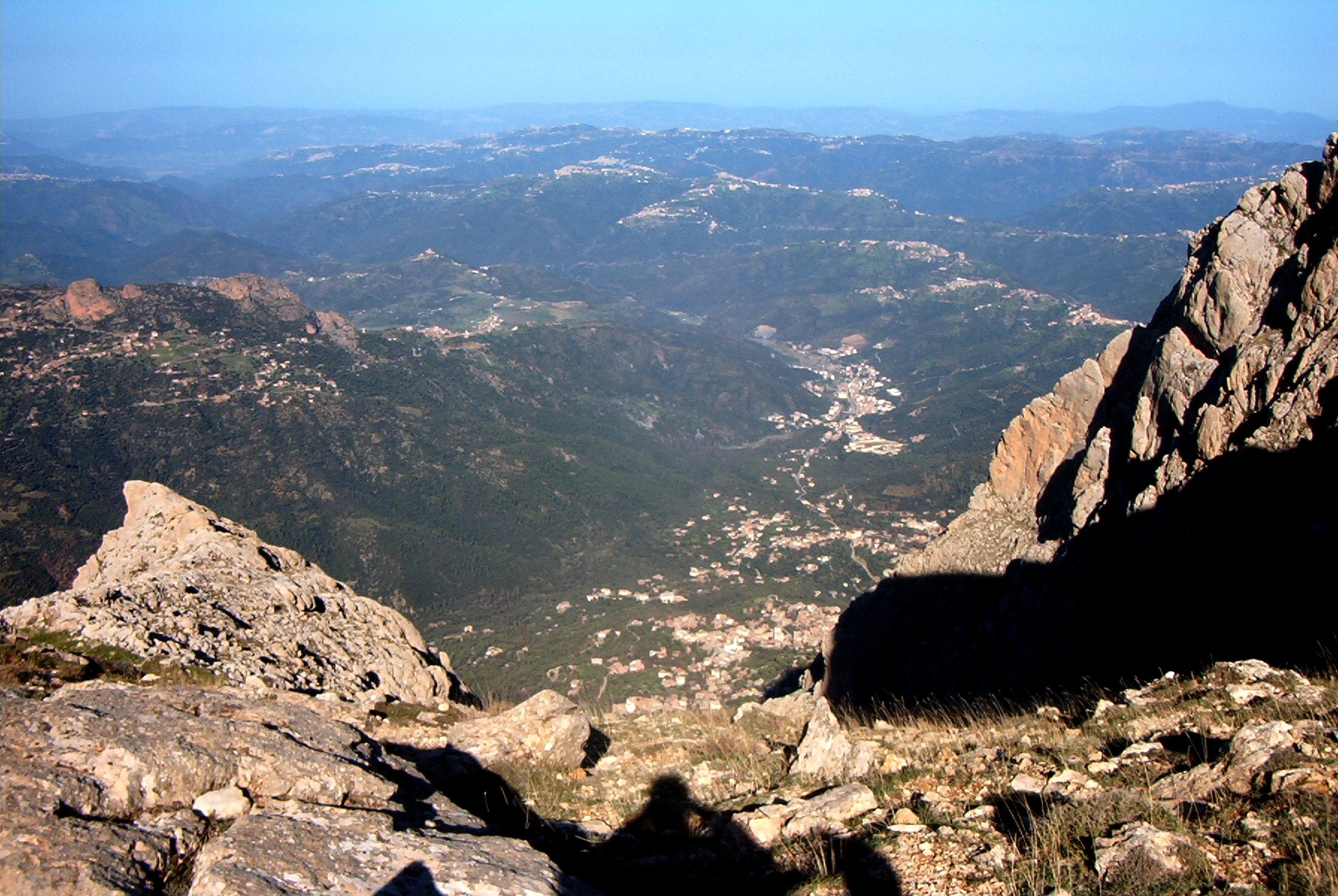
- Landscape of Tizi Ouzou viewed from Djurdjura

- Flag

- Map of Algeria highlighting Tizi Ouzou
- Coordinates: 36°44′N 04°04′E
- Country: Algeria
- Capital: Tizi Ouzou

Government
  - Wāli: Aboubakr Esseddik Boucetta

Area
  - Total: 2,993 km^{2} (1,156 sq mi)

Population (2008)
  - Total: 1,119,646
  - Density: 374.1/km^{2} (968.9/sq mi)
- Time zone: UTC+01 (CET)
- Area Code: +213 (0) 26
- ISO 3166 code: DZ-15
- Districts: 21
- Municipalities: 67
- Website: www.tiziouzou-dz.com

Tizi Ouzou (Kabyle: Tawilayt n Tizi Wezzu, Arabic: ولاية تيزي وزو) is a province (wilayah) of Algeria in the Kabylia region. Its capital is Tizi Ouzou, with a population of 1,198,561 inhabitants in 2019. The population density is 405 people per square kilometer.

== History ==
In 1984, Boumerdès Province was carved out of its territory.

== Administrative divisions ==
The province is divided into 21 districts (daïras), which are further divided into 67 communes or municipalities.

=== Districts ===
1. Aïn El Hammam
2. Azazga
3. Azzefoun
4. Béni Douala
5. Béni Yenni
6. Boghni
7. Bouzeguène
8. Draâ Ben Khedda
9. Draâ El Mizan
10. Iferhounène
11. Larbaâ Nath Irathen
12. Maâtka
13. Makouda
14. Mekla
15. Ouadhia
16. Ouacifs
17. Ouaguenoun
18. Tigzirt
19. Tizi Gheni
20. Tizi Ouzou
21. Tizi Rached

=== Communes ===
1. Abi Youcef
2. Aghni-Goughrane (Agouni Gueghrane)
3. Aghrib
4. Aïn El Hammam (Ain-El-Hammam)
5. Aïn Zaouia (Ain-Zaouia)
6. Ait Aggouacha
7. Ait Bouaddou
8. Ait Boumehdi (Ait Boumahdi)
9. Ait Chaffaa (Ait-Chaffaa, Ait Chafâa)
10. Ait Khelili (Ait Khellili)
11. Ait Mahmoud (Ait-Mahmoud)
12. Ait Oumalou
13. Ait Toudert
14. Ait Yahia (Ait-Yahia
15. Ait Yahia Moussa (Aït Yahia Moussa)
16. Akbil
17. Akerrou
18. Assi Youcef
19. Azazga
20. Azzefoun (Azeffoun)
21. Beni Aissi (Beni Aïssi)
22. Beni Douala (Beni-Douala)
23. Beni Yenni
24. Beni Ziki (Beni Zikki, Beni Zekki)
25. Beni Zmenzer
26. Boghni
27. Boudjima
28. Bounouh
29. Bouzguen (Bouzeguene)
30. Djebel Aissa Mimoun (Djebel-Aissa Mimoun)
31. Draa Ben Kheda (Draa Ben Khedda, Draâ Ben Khedda)
32. Draa El Mizan (Draâ El Mizan)
33. Freha
34. Frikat
35. Iboudraren
36. Idjeur
37. Iferhounene (Iferhounène)
38. Ifigha
39. Iflissen
40. Illilten
41. Iloula Oumalou (Illoula Oumalou)
42. Imsouhal
43. Irdjen
44. Larba Nait Irathen (Larbaâ Nath Irathen)
45. M'Kira
46. Maatkas (Mâatkas)
47. Makouda
48. Mechtrass
49. Mekla
50. Mizrana
51. Ouacifs
52. Ouadhia
53. Ouaguenoun
54. Sidi Nâamane
55. Souamaa (Souamâa)
56. Souk El Tenine (Souk El Thenine)
57. Tadmait (Tadmaït)
58. Tigzirt
59. Timizart
60. Tirmirtine (Tirmitine)
61. Tizi Ghenif (Tizi-Ghenif)
62. Tizi N'Thlata (Tizi N'Tleta)
63. Tizi Ouzou
64. Tizi Rached (Tizi-Rached)
65. Yakouren (Yakourene)
66. Yatafene (Yattafene, Yattafène)
67. Zekri

== Villages ==
- Tala Allam
- Tala Athmane
- Lake Akfadou

== Notable people ==
- Mohamed Belhocine, Algerian medical scientist, professor of internal medicine and epidemiology.
