= Draâ Ben Khedda =

Draâ Ben Khedda ⴷⵔⴰ ⴱⴻⵏ ⵅⴻⴷⴷⴰ Mirabeau
- Commune and town
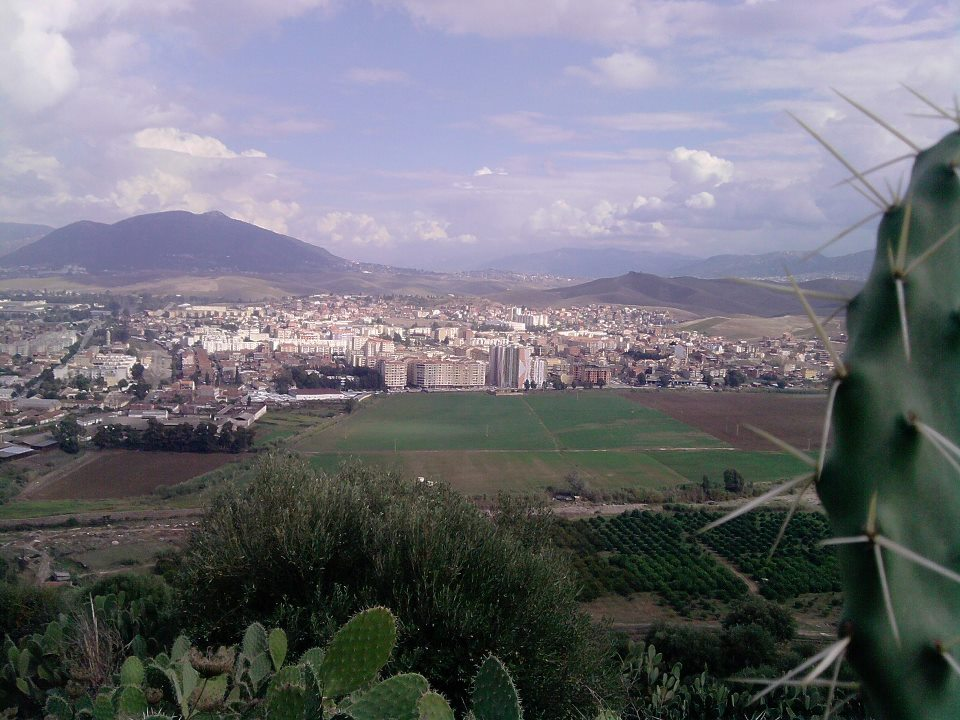
- General view of the city of Draâ Ben Khedda from Mount Sidi Ali Bounab.
- Nickname: ذراع بن خدة

- Location within Algeria
- Coordinates: 36°44′N 3°58′E
- Country: Algeria
- Province: Tizi Ouzou Province

Population (2008)
  - Total: 29,403
- Time zone: UTC+1 (CET)
- Postal code: 15100

Draâ Ben Khedda (in Berber ⴷⵔⴰ ⴱⴻⵏ ⵅⴻⴷⴷⴰ, in French Mirabeau) is a town and commune in Tizi Ouzou Province in northern Algeria.

The territory of the commune is bordered to the north by the Oued Sebaou and crossed by the Oued Bougdoura in its western part.

== Background ==
The town of Draâ Ben Khedda was a relatively developed industrial center in the eastern region of Lower Kabylie, several factories are located in the city, among which the most notable is the textile industry complex specialized in weaving (formerly Cotitex - Industrial Cotton Factory And textile), opened in the early years of independence, is one of the first steps in the country's industrialization. It has enjoyed a quarter century of prosperity, employing 5,600 workers. Its decline, which began in the mid-1980s with problems of equipment deterioration, will intensify in the 1990s with Over-stocking of production due to declining quality and competition from imported products; It will lose at every stage a thousand jobs through cuts, voluntary departures and retirements. Currently and since 2011, the complex is affiliated with the Algerian Industrial and Technical Textile Company (EATIT) and has a little more than 600 workers.

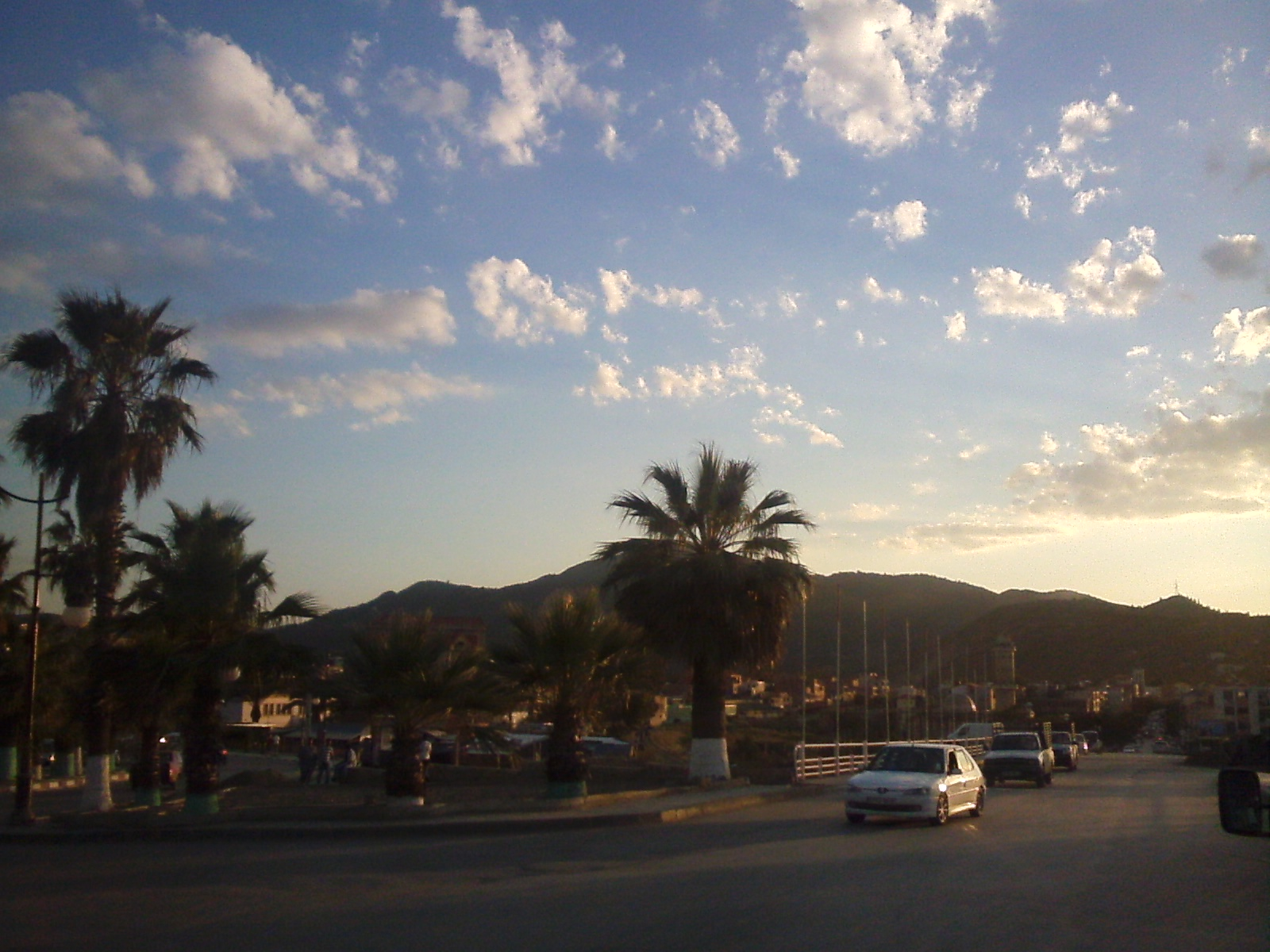
A view of the city of Draâ Ben Khedda, and Mount Sidi Ali Bounab on the horizon.

The dairy production complex (formerly Orlac - Center Milk Center), which was privatized in 2008, was created in the early 1970s and was considered one of the flagship of the local and national dairy industry.
