= Boghni =

- Commune and town
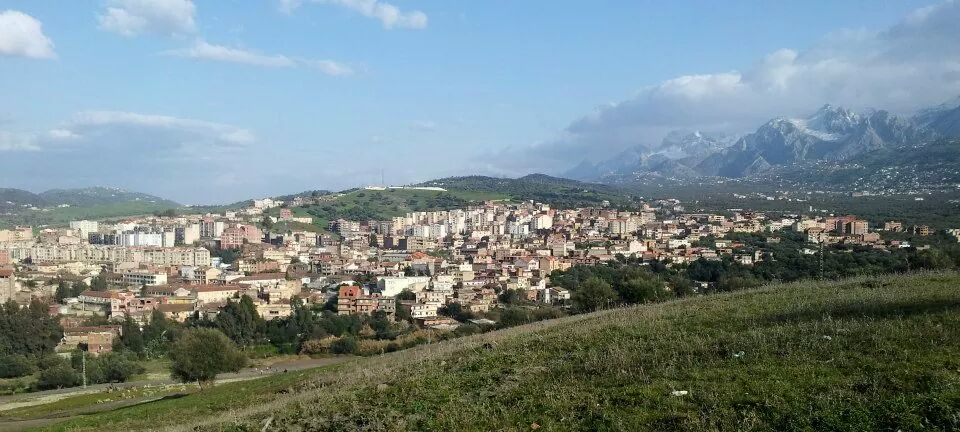

- Location within Algeria
- Country: Algeria
- Province: Tizi Ouzou Province
- Time zone: UTC+1 (CET)

Boghni is a town and commune in Tizi Ouzou Province in northern Algeria. It is located in the south of Tizi Ouzou, surrounded by Djurdjura mountain and surrounded by Maatekas, Beni Kouffi, Voughardane, Mechtras and other small communes. Boghni is known as the fourth most connected small village to Internet in the world.

== Economy ==
Agriculture is the main activity of the commune of Boghni. Livestock is the most important agricultural activity. The livestock is made up of cattle, goats and sheep. The village of Aït Mendes is renowned for its cheeses.
