= Zekri =

- Commune and town

- Location within Algeria
- Coordinates: 36°46′55″N 4°35′20″E
- Country: Algeria
- Province: Tizi Ouzou Province
- Time zone: UTC+1 (CET)

Zekri is a town and commune in Tizi Ouzou Province in northern Algeria.
