= Béni Yenni District =

Coordinates: 36.5752°N 4.2076°E

- District
- Country: Algeria
- Province: Tizi Ouzou Province
- Time zone: UTC+1 (CET)

Béni Yenni District is a district of Tizi Ouzou Province, Algeria.

The district is further divided into 3 municipalities:

- Beni Yenni
- Iboudraren
- Yattafène
