= Illoula Oumalou =

Coordinates: 36°35′N 4°25′E

- Commune and town

- Location within Algeria
- Country: Algeria
- Province: Tizi Ouzou Province
- Time zone: UTC+1 (CET)

Illoula Oumalou is a town and commune in Tizi Ouzou Province in northern Algeria.
