= Boudjima =

Coordinates: 36°48′N 4°09′E

Boudjemaa
- Commune and town
- Interactive map of Boudjemaa
- Country: Algeria
- Province: Tizi Ouzou Province
- Time zone: UTC+1 (CET)

Boudjemaa is a town and commune in Tizi Ouzou Province in northern Algeria.
