= Timizart =

- Commune and town
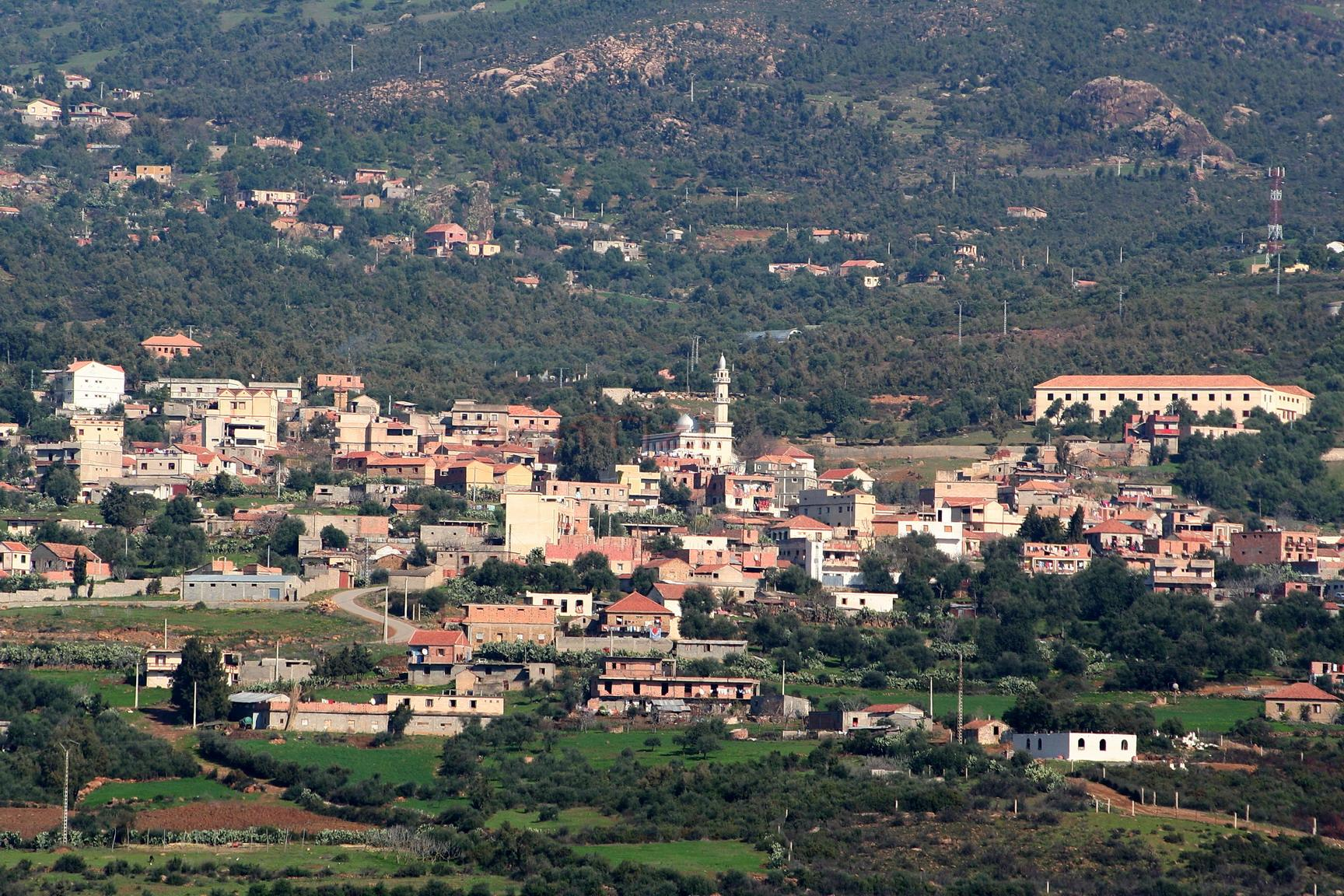

- Location within Algeria
- Country: Algeria
- Province: Tizi Ouzou Province
- Time zone: UTC+1 (CET)

Timizart is a town and commune in Tizi Ouzou Province in northern Algeria.

== Economy ==
The Tmizart economy is based mainly on the retail and transport.

It is also characterized by agriculture based on polyculture and animal husbandry. The herd is made up of cattle, most of which are raised for dairy or meat production. Sheep and goats are also raised here.

Timizart is known for its cheeses (including Tomme, Edam cheese, Gouda cheese and Goat cheese).
