= Idjeur =

Coordinates: 36.6664°N 4.5186°E

- Commune and town
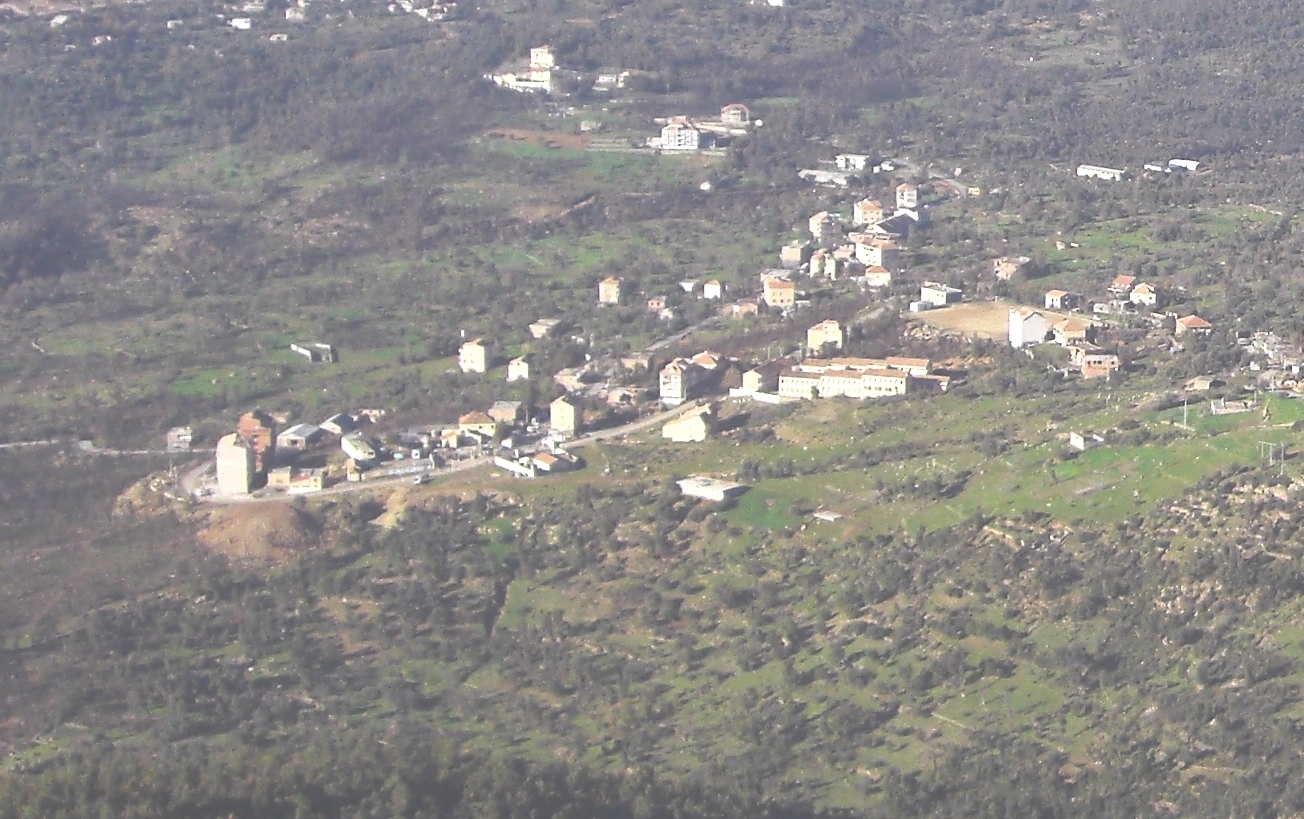
- Interactive map of Idjeur
- Country: Algeria
- Province: Tizi Ouzou Province
- Time zone: UTC+1 (CET)

Idjeur is a town and commune in Tizi Ouzou Province in northern Algeria.
