= Akerrou =

- Commune and town
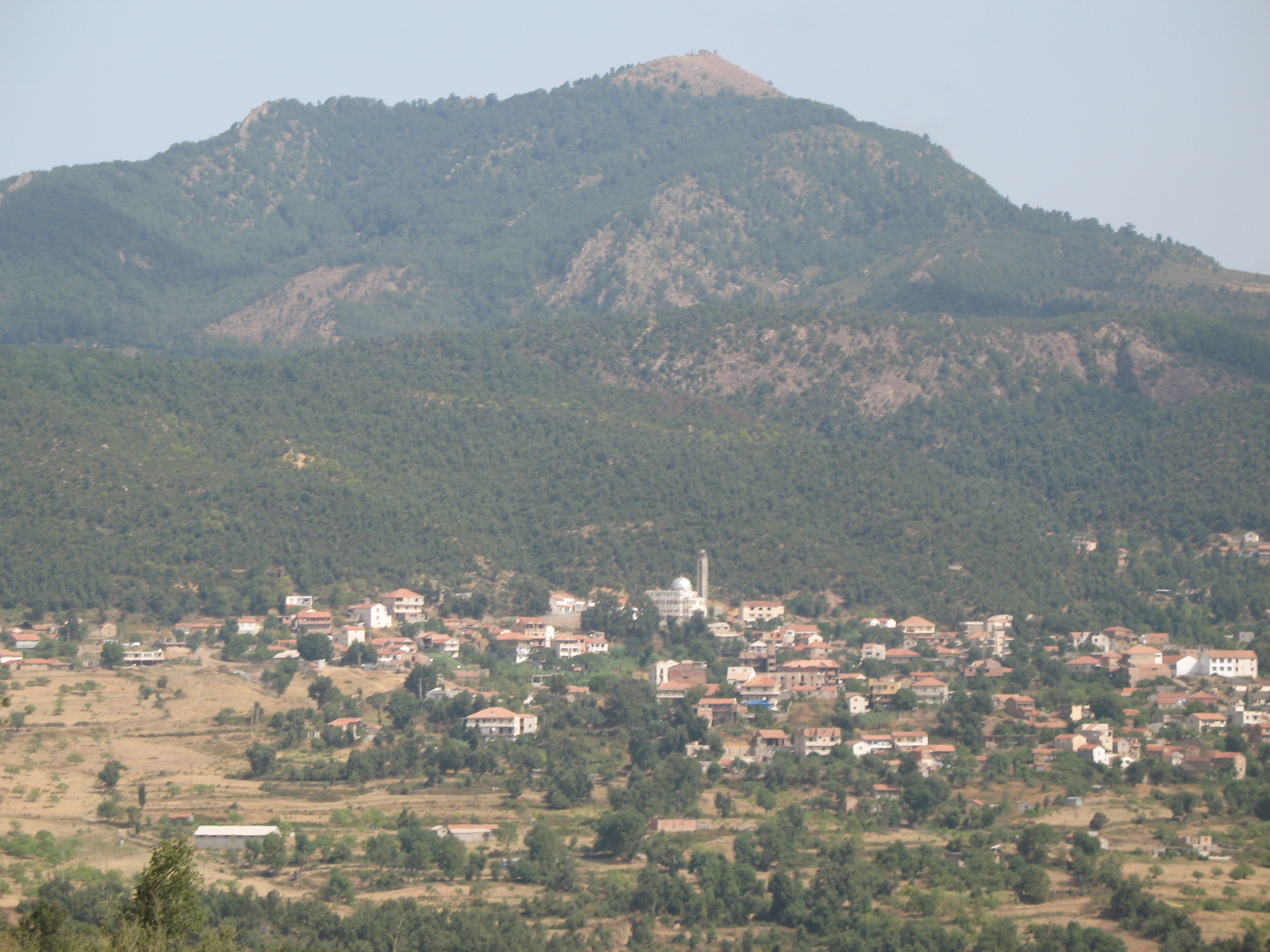

- Location within Algeria
- Coordinates: 36°47′57″N 4°25′14″E
- Country: Algeria
- Province: Tizi Ouzou Province

Area
  - Total: 16.12 sq mi (41.75 km^{2})
- Time zone: UTC+1 (CET)
- cp: 15370

Akerrou is a town and commune in Tizi Ouzou Province in northern Algeria.
