= Tizi Rached =

- Commune and town
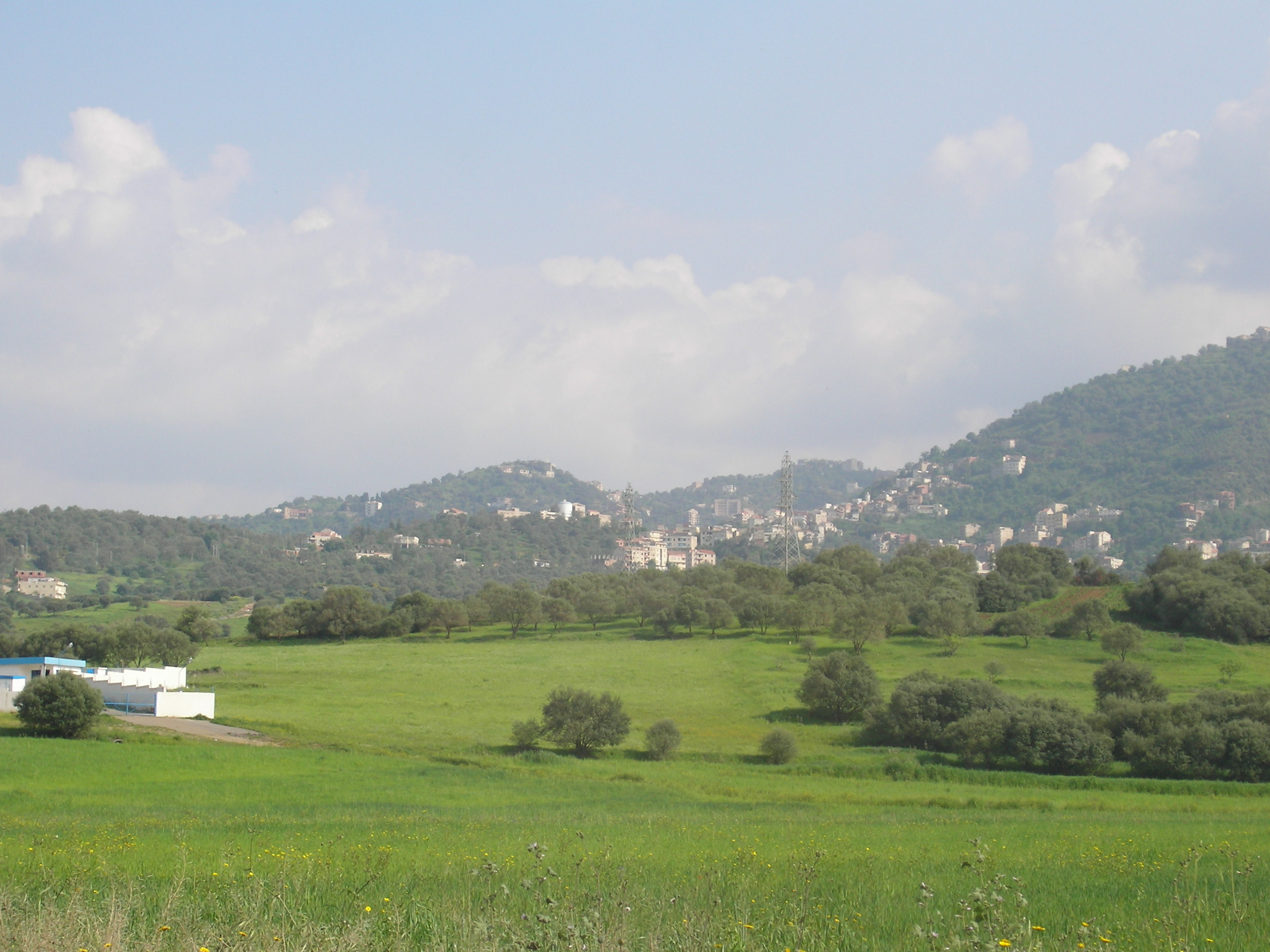

- Location within Algeria
- Country: Algeria
- Province: Tizi Ouzou Province
- Time zone: UTC+1 (CET)

Tizi Rached is a town and commune in Tizi Ouzou Province in northern Algeria.
