= Aït Yahia Moussa =

Coordinates: 36°38′28″N 3°53′18″E

- Commune and town
- Interactive map of Aït Yahia Moussa
- Country: Algeria
- Province: Tizi Ouzou Province
- Time zone: UTC+1 (CET)
- Climate: Csa

Aït Yahia Moussa is a town and commune in Tizi Ouzou Province in northern Algeria.
