= Ifigha =

- Commune and town
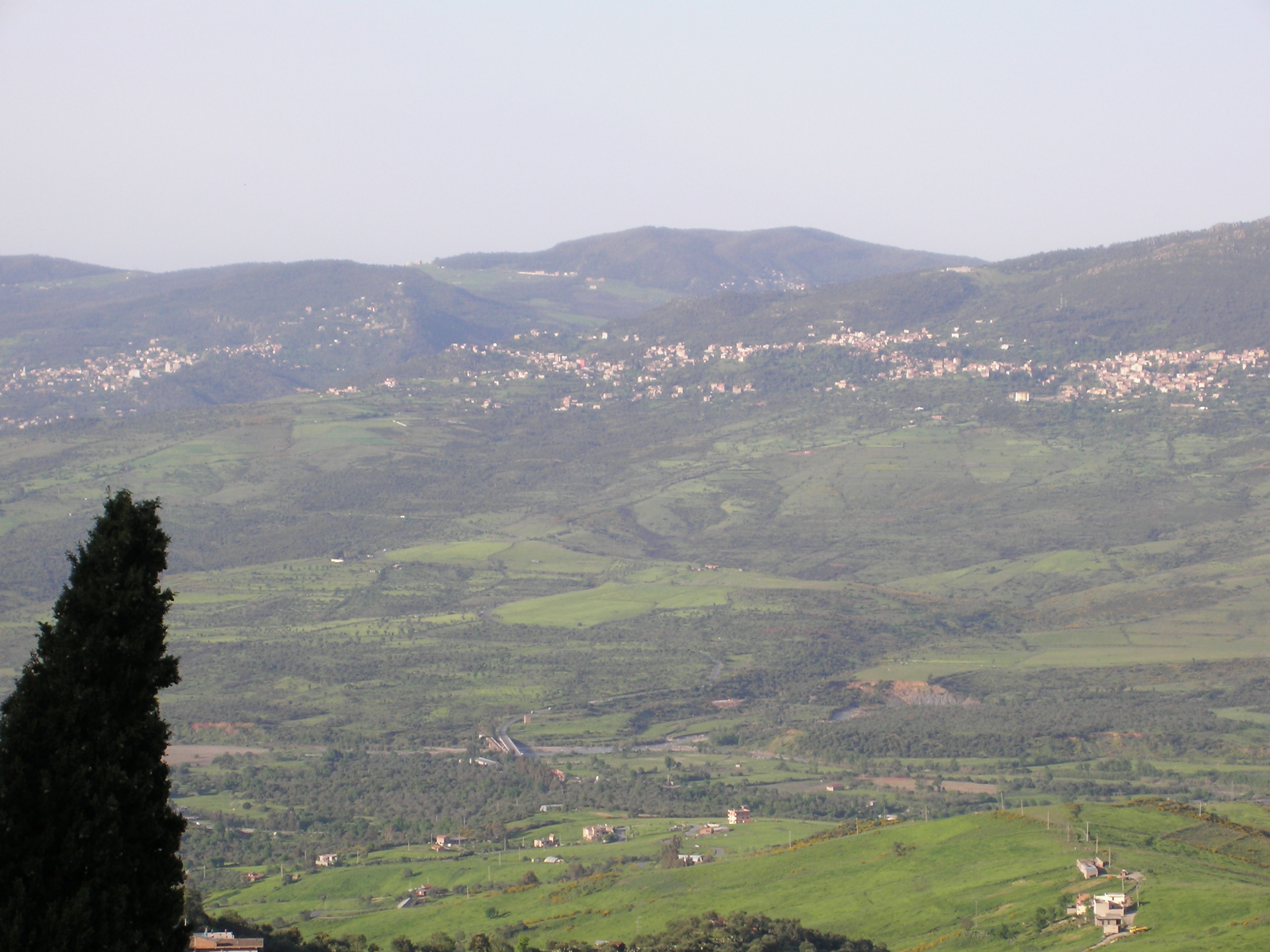

- Location within Algeria
- Country: Algeria
- Province: Tizi Ouzou Province
- Time zone: UTC+1 (CET)

Ifigha is a commune in northern Algeria in the Tizi Ouzou Province in the Kabylia region.
