= Aït Oumalou =

Coordinates: 36.6516°N 4.2220°E

- Commune and town
- Interactive map of Aït Oumalou
- Country: Algeria
- Province: Tizi Ouzou Province
- Time zone: UTC+1 (CET)

Aït Oumalou is a town and commune in Tizi Ouzou Province in northern Algeria.
