= Beni Yenni =

Beni Yenni Ath Yenni/بني يني
- Commune and town
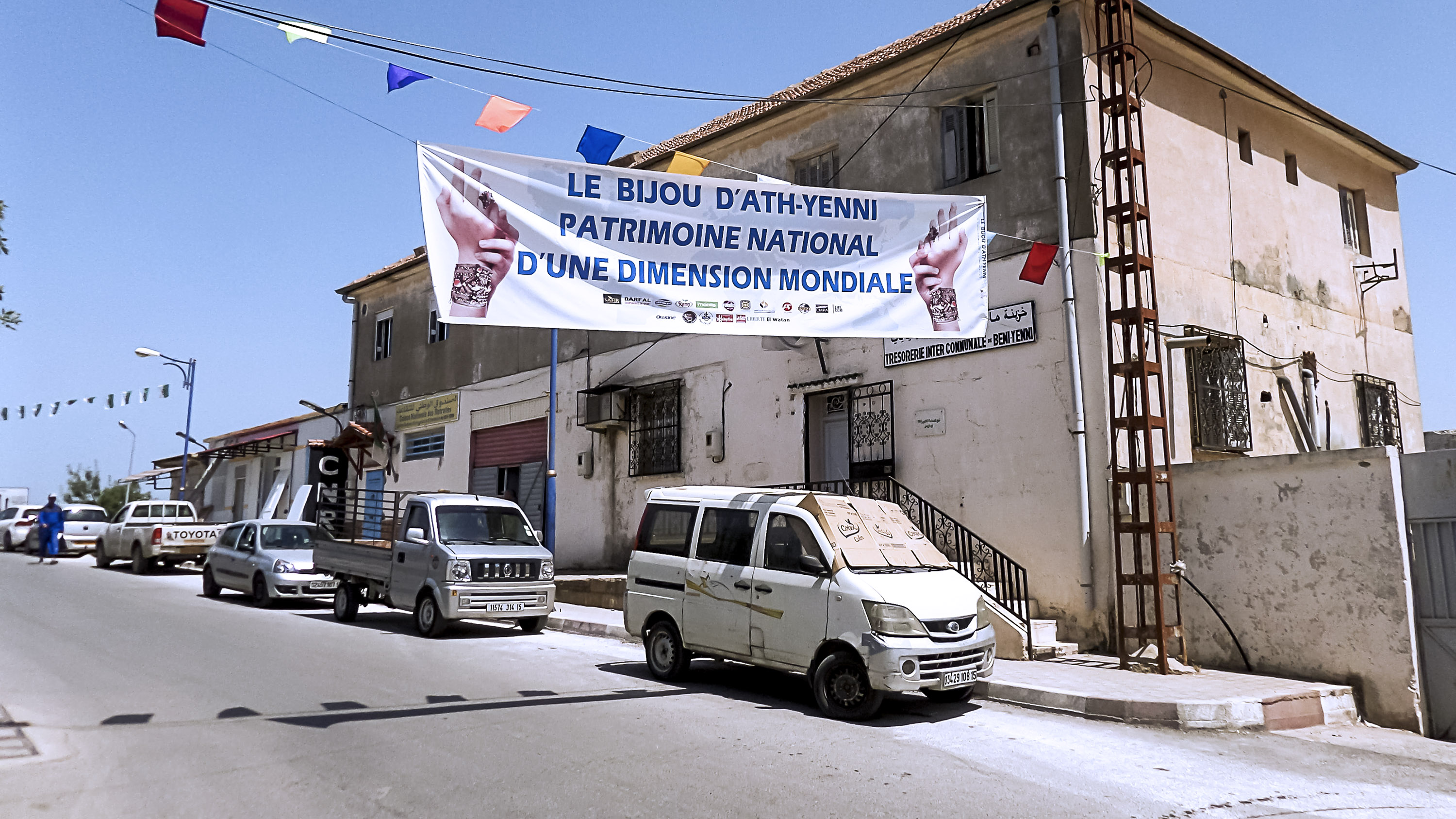

- Location within Algeria
- Country: Algeria
- Province: Tizi Ouzou Province
- Time zone: UTC+1 (CET)

Beni Yenni (Arabic: بني يني; Kabyle: Ath Yenni) is a town and commune in Tizi Ouzou Province in northern Algeria.
