= Assi Youcef =

Coordinates: 36.5071°N 4.0186°E

Assi Youcef At vu Gherdan At vu Gherdan
- Commune and town
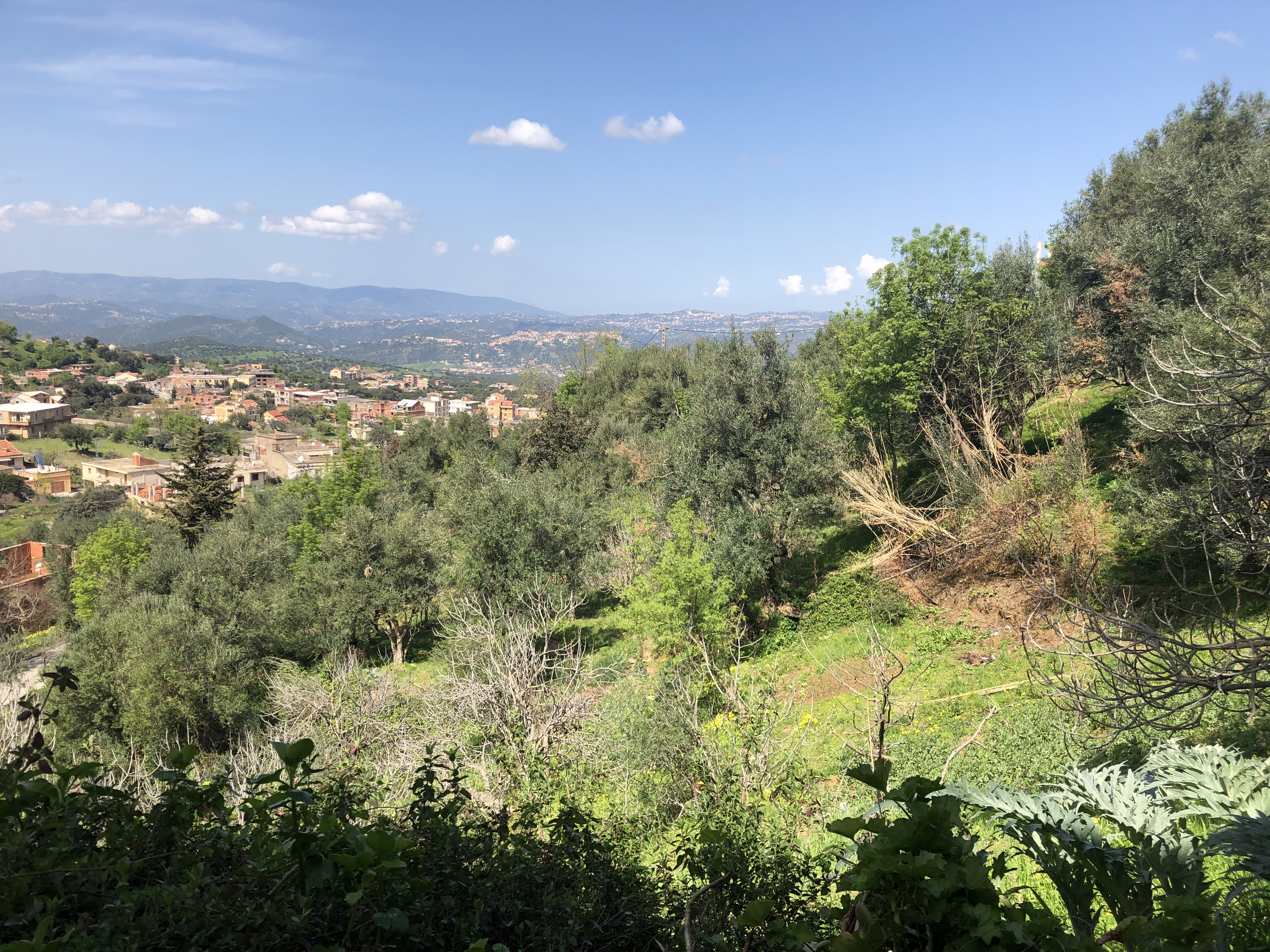
- Interactive map of Assi Youcef
- Country: Algeria
- Province: Tizi Ouzou Province
- Time zone: UTC+1 (CET)

At vu gherdan is a town and commune in Tizi Ouzou Province in northern Algeria.
