= Béni Douala District =

Coordinates: 36.6167°N 4.0667°E

At Dwala District At Dwala
- District
- Interactive map of At Dwala District
- Country: Algeria
- Province: Tizi Ouzou Province
- Time zone: UTC+1 (CET)

Béni Douala District is a district of Tizi Ouzou Province, Algeria.

The district is further divided into 4 municipalities:

- Aït Mahmoud
- Béni-Aïssi
- Beni Douala
- Beni Zmenzer
