= Mâatkas =

- Commune and town
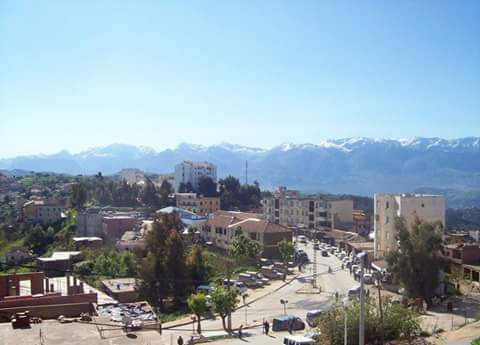

- Location within Algeria
- Country: Algeria
- Province: Tizi Ouzou Province

Population (2008)
  - Total: 26,142
- Time zone: UTC+1 (CET)

Mâatkas is a town and commune in Tizi Ouzou Province in northern Algeria.
