= Souk El Thenine =

- Commune and town
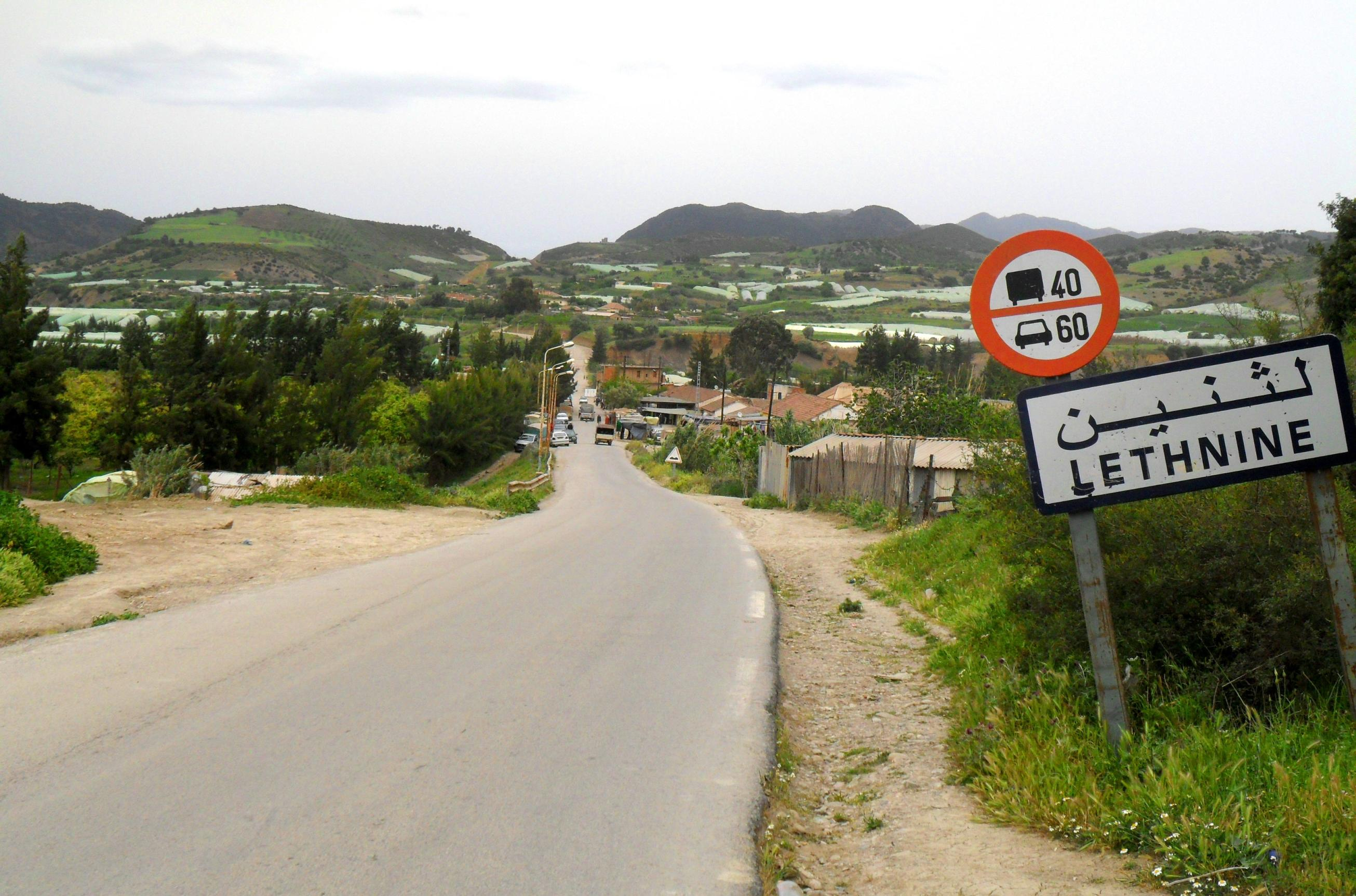

- Location within Algeria
- Country: Algeria
- Province: Tizi Ouzou Province
- Time zone: UTC+1 (CET)

Souk El Thenine is a town and commune that is located in Tizi Ouzou Province in northern Algeria.
