= Tizi Ouzou =

Tizi Ouzou Tizi Wezzu ⵜⵉⵣⵉ ⵓⵣⵣⵓ تيزي وزو
- City
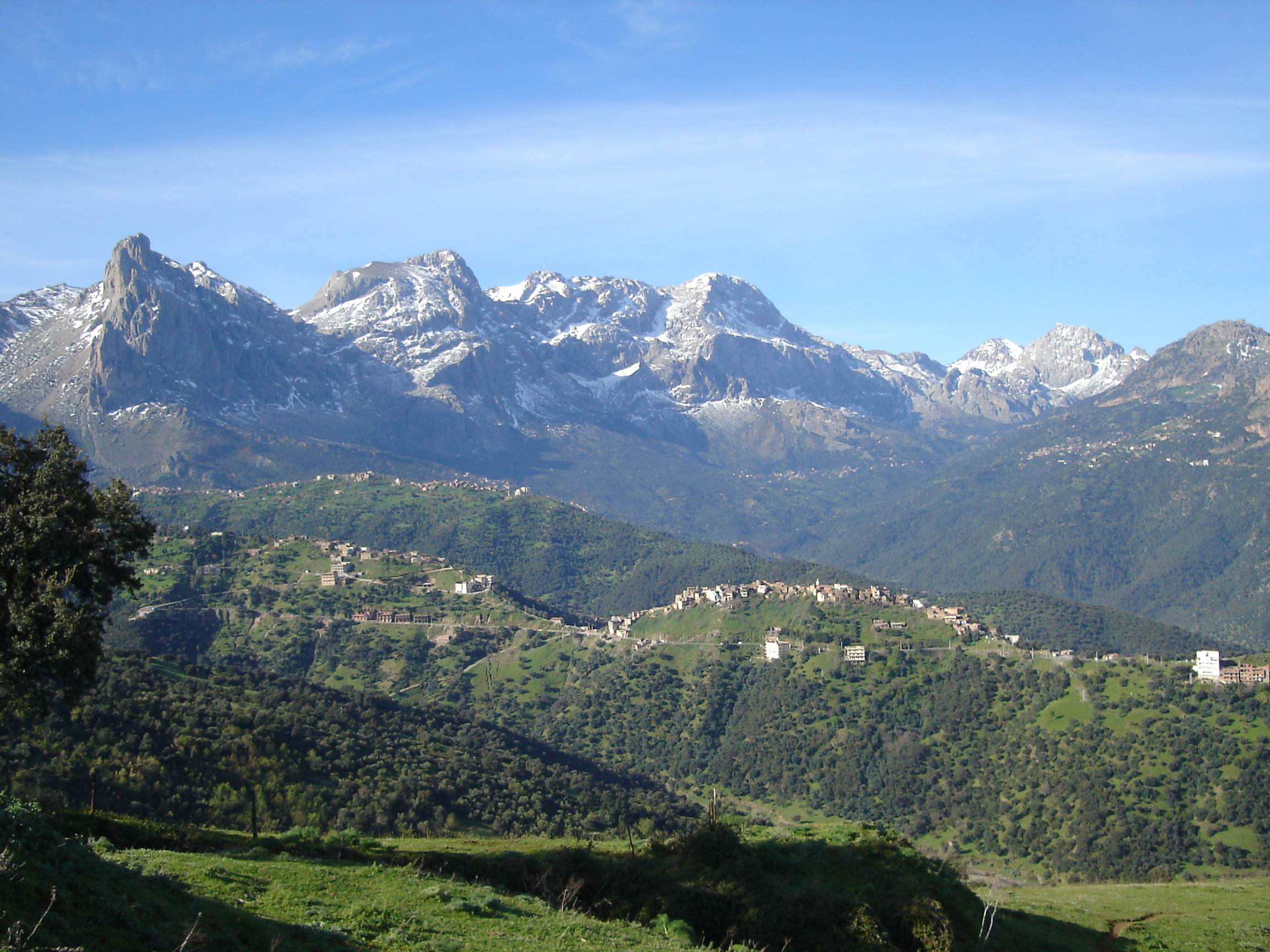
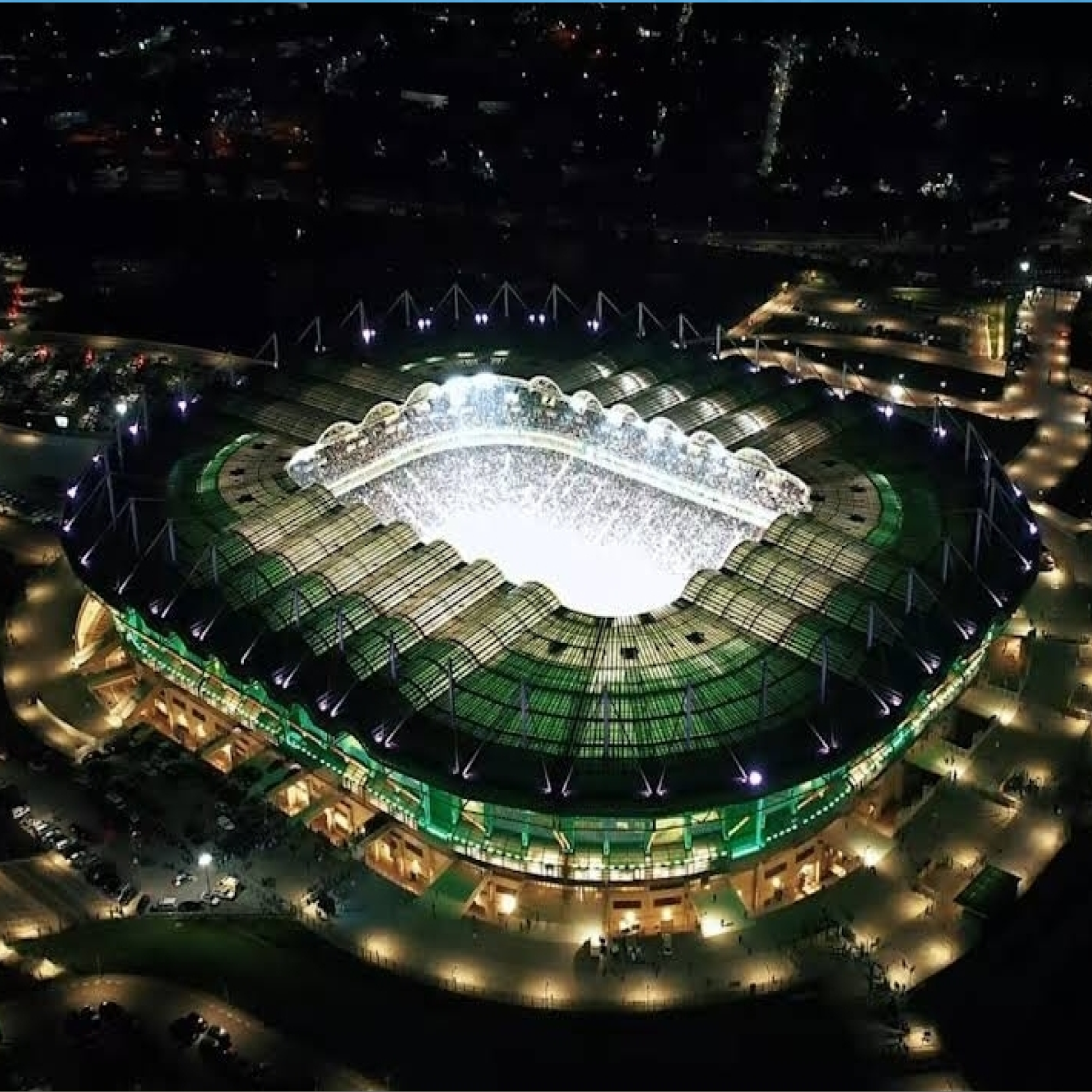
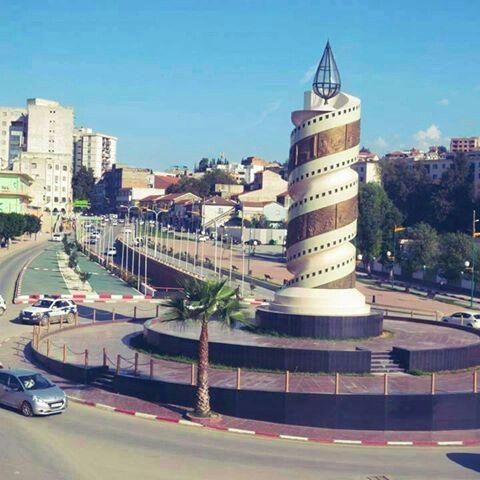
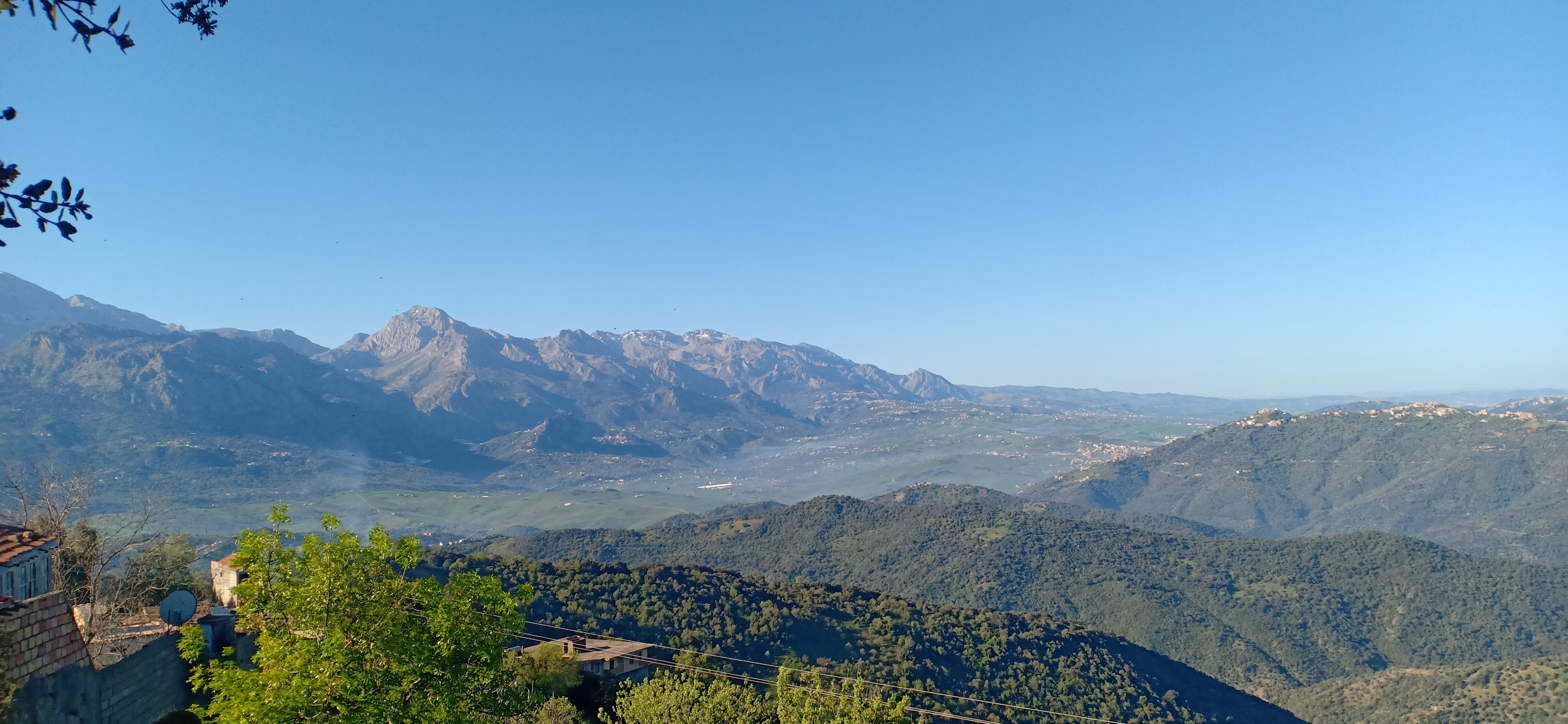
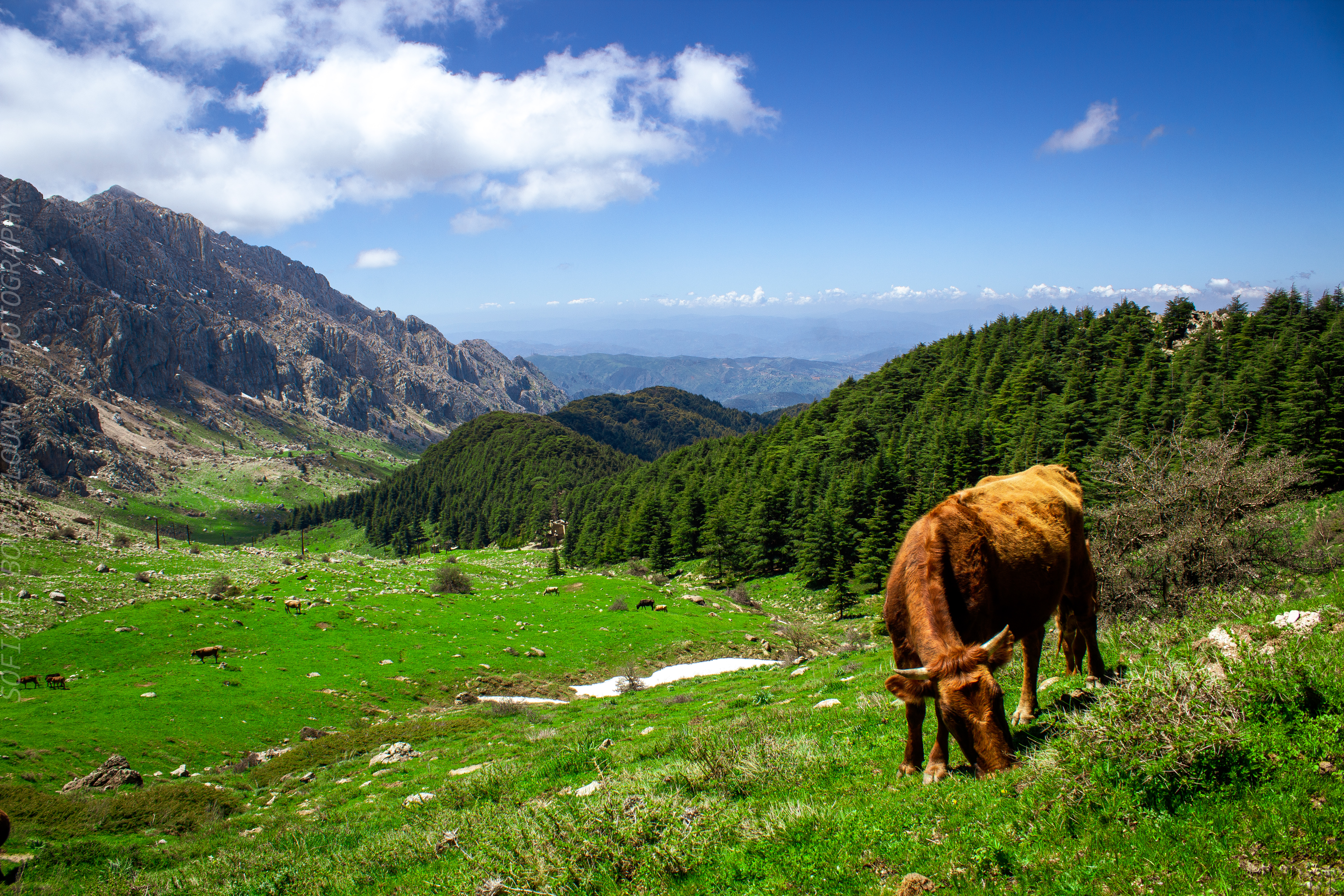
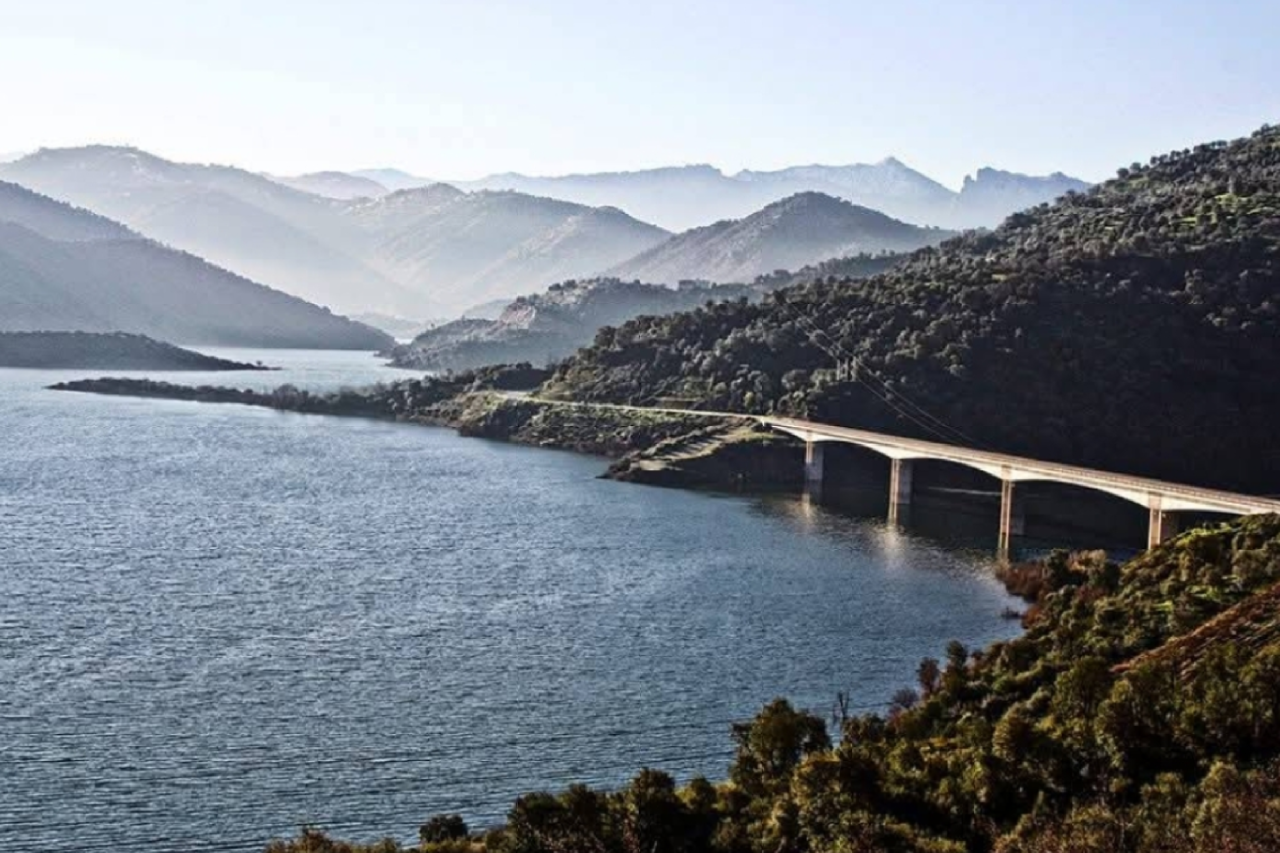
- Djurdjura National Park Hocine Aït Ahmed Stadium Monument de la Bougie At Yenni Tala Guilef Taksebt Dam
- Nickname: "The Capital Of Djurdjura"

- Location within Algeria
- Coordinates: 36°43′N 4°3′E
- Country: Algeria
- Province: Tizi Ouzou Province
- District: Tizi Ouzou District

Area
  - Total: 102.36 km^{2} (39.52 sq mi)

Population (2008 census)
  - Total: 135,088
  - Density: 1,319.7/km^{2} (3,418.1/sq mi)
- Time zone: UTC+1 (CET)
- Postal code: 15000
- Climate: Csa
- Website: www.andi.dz/index.php/en/monographie-des-wilayas?id=113%2F

Tizi Ouzou or Tizi Wezzu (Kabyle: Tizi Wezzu, Arabic: تيزي وزو) is a city in north central Algeria, and capital of Tizi Ouzou Province and Tizi Ouzou District. It is among the largest cities in Algeria. It is the second most populous city in the Kabylia region after Béjaïa.

== History ==
=== Foundation ===
Tizi Ouzou was founded in 1856, after the successful expedition of France against Kabyle tribes.

=== Etymology ===
The name Tizi Ouzou is made up of two Kabyle words: Tizi meaning col, and Ouzou (from Azzu) meaning Genisteae. The full name of the locality therefore means "the col of the Genisteae".

=== Friction ===
Islamists looted, and burned to the ground, a Pentecostal church on 9 January 2010. The pastor was quoted as saying that worshipers fled when local police left a gang of local rioters unchecked.

== Geography ==
This city is located in the heart of Kabylie. It is 102.36 square kilometres (39.52 sq mi) in area. Tizi Ouzou is located in the valley of Assif N Sébaou. It is surrounded by mountains. The city is at an altitude of 200 metres (660 ft). It is bounded on the north by Mount Belloua which rises to 850 metres (2,790 ft) above sea level. A portion of the old city of Tizi Ouzou (known as the High City) backed the east slopes of the mountain. At the top of the mountain Belloua lies the village of Redjaouna. The latter is attached to the town of Tizi Ouzou.

=== Climate ===
Tizi Ouzou experiences a hot Mediterranean climate (Köppen climate classification Csa).

Climate data for Tizi Ouzou (1991–2020)
Month	Jan	Feb	Mar	Apr	May	Jun	Jul	Aug	Sep	Oct	Nov	Dec	Year
Record high °C (°F)	26.6 (79.9)	30.0 (86.0)	34.4 (93.9)	37.8 (100.0)	41.0 (105.8)	44.4 (111.9)	47.8 (118.0)	47.4 (117.3)	44.1 (111.4)	40.5 (104.9)	31.9 (89.4)	27.0 (80.6)	47.8 (118.0)
Mean daily maximum °C (°F)	15.5 (59.9)	16.5 (61.7)	19.4 (66.9)	21.9 (71.4)	26.2 (79.2)	31.7 (89.1)	35.9 (96.6)	36.2 (97.2)	31.4 (88.5)	26.8 (80.2)	20.2 (68.4)	16.4 (61.5)	24.8 (76.6)
Daily mean °C (°F)	10.9 (51.6)	11.5 (52.7)	14.0 (57.2)	16.3 (61.3)	20.1 (68.2)	24.8 (76.6)	28.6 (83.5)	29.0 (84.2)	25.1 (77.2)	21.0 (69.8)	15.5 (59.9)	12.1 (53.8)	19.1 (66.4)
Mean daily minimum °C (°F)	6.3 (43.3)	6.5 (43.7)	8.6 (47.5)	10.6 (51.1)	14.0 (57.2)	18.0 (64.4)	21.3 (70.3)	21.9 (71.4)	18.9 (66.0)	15.2 (59.4)	10.8 (51.4)	7.7 (45.9)	13.3 (55.9)
Record low °C (°F)	−3.0 (26.6)	−0.6 (30.9)	0.0 (32.0)	1.7 (35.1)	3.5 (38.3)	8.1 (46.6)	13.5 (56.3)	15.5 (59.9)	11.0 (51.8)	6.4 (43.5)	1.2 (34.2)	0.3 (32.5)	−3.0 (26.6)
Average precipitation mm (inches)	124.4 (4.90)	92.6 (3.65)	81.6 (3.21)	79.6 (3.13)	55.9 (2.20)	10.7 (0.42)	2.4 (0.09)	5.5 (0.22)	37.8 (1.49)	65.2 (2.57)	113.6 (4.47)	120.0 (4.72)	789.3 (31.07)
Average precipitation days (≥ 1.0 mm)	10.5	9.7	8.3	7.5	5.2	1.8	0.6	1.5	4.6	6.4	10.1	9.9	76.1
Source: NOAA

== Demographics ==
There are 135,088 people in 2008.

== Education ==
Mouloud Mammeri University of Tizi-Ouzou is the local university. There are three campuses: Campus Hasnaoua I, Campus Hasnaoua II, and Campus Tamda.

== Sport ==
The local professional football team is JS Kabylie that is considered one of the most historical clubs in Algeria.

== Economy ==
Agriculture (dairy industry) and some factories brick factories, pharmaceutical factories (Novo).

== Notable people ==
- Mohamed Belhocine, Algerian medical scientist, professor of internal medicine and epidemiology
- Hamza Bendelladj, Algerian cyber-criminal
- Faiza Lalam, Africa's first woman neurosurgeon
- Issad Rebrab, Algerian billionaire businessman
- Youcef Dris, writer and journalist

== External sources ==
- Jonathan Oaks: Algeria. Bradt Travel Guides 2008, ISBN 978-1-84162-232-3, p. 110 (restricted online version (Google Books))
- "Geographical information on Tizi Ouzou, Algeria". Falling Rain Genomics, Inc.
