= Hocine Ziani =

Algerian painter (born 1953)

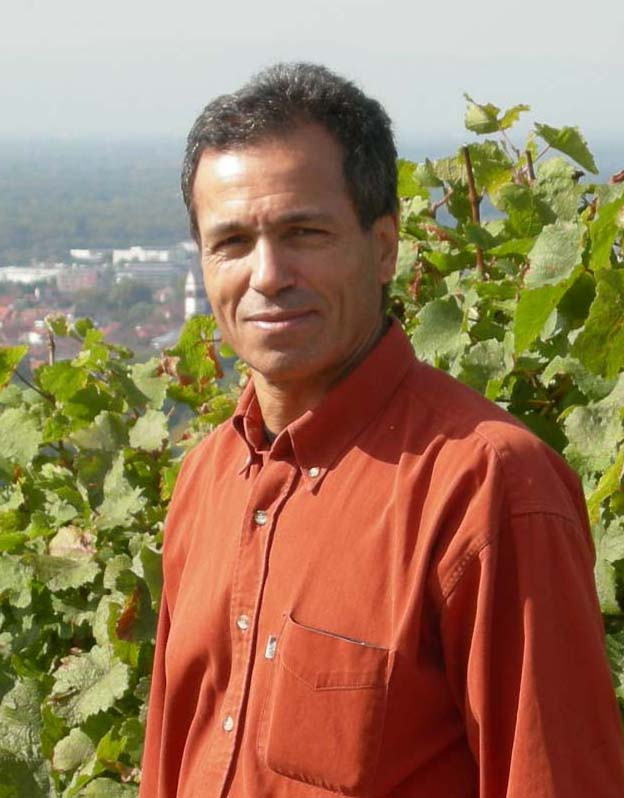
- Ziani in 2009
- Born: 3 May 1953 (age 73); Sidi Daoud, Algeria
- Known for: Painting; Plastic arts
- Style: Figurative art Orientalism Contemporary art
- Website: ziani.eu

Hocine Ziani (Kabyle: Ḥusin Ziani; born 3 May 1953) is an Algerian painter and artist in plastic arts.

== Early years ==
Ziani was born on 3 May 1953 in Sidi Daoud to a Kabyle family living in the countryside of lower Kabylia near Zawiyet Sidi Amar Cherif and not far from the course of Oued Sebaou in the current Boumerdès Province. He then spent his childhood in cultural isolation in the first years which coincided with the start of the Algerian revolution.

In 1964, two years after the independence of his country, he enrolled in the primary school of Sidi Daoud at the age of 11 and devoted himself to drawing and art as a self-taught. He joined his internship studies in an accounting college in the nearby town of Bordj Menaïel in 1969, then moved to Algiers in 1973 to continue his studies and obtain an accountant position in a national company.

From November 1974 to February 1977, he performed his military service in the Algerian desert within the Algerian Army, and on this occasion, he discovered the Sahara, in particular the Hoggar and the culture of the Tuaregs. As soon as he returned to civilian life, where he found his professional activity in accounting in 1978 he dropped the profession for art.

== Career ==
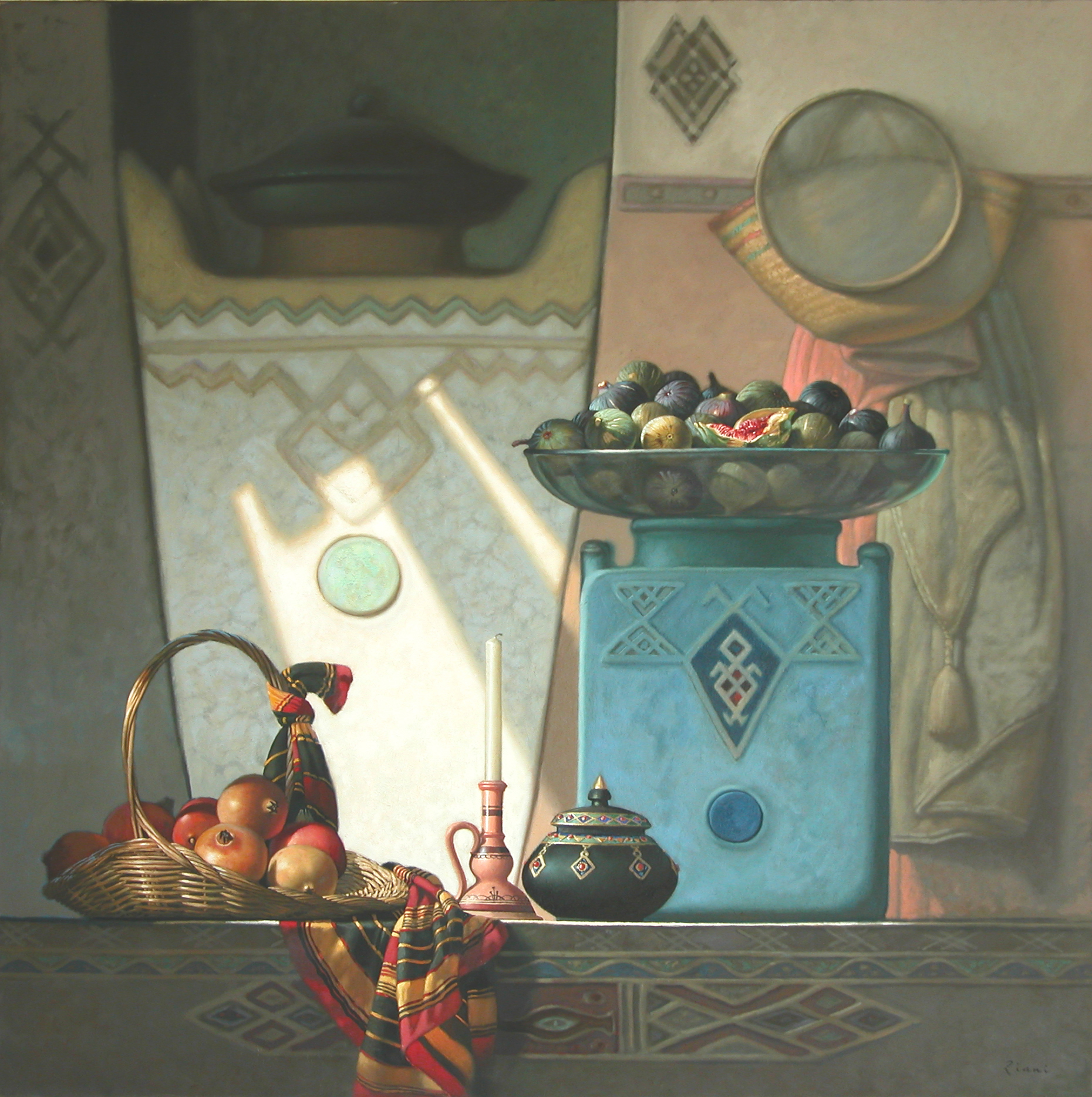
Le Silo bleu, by Ziani, oil on canvas, 2010

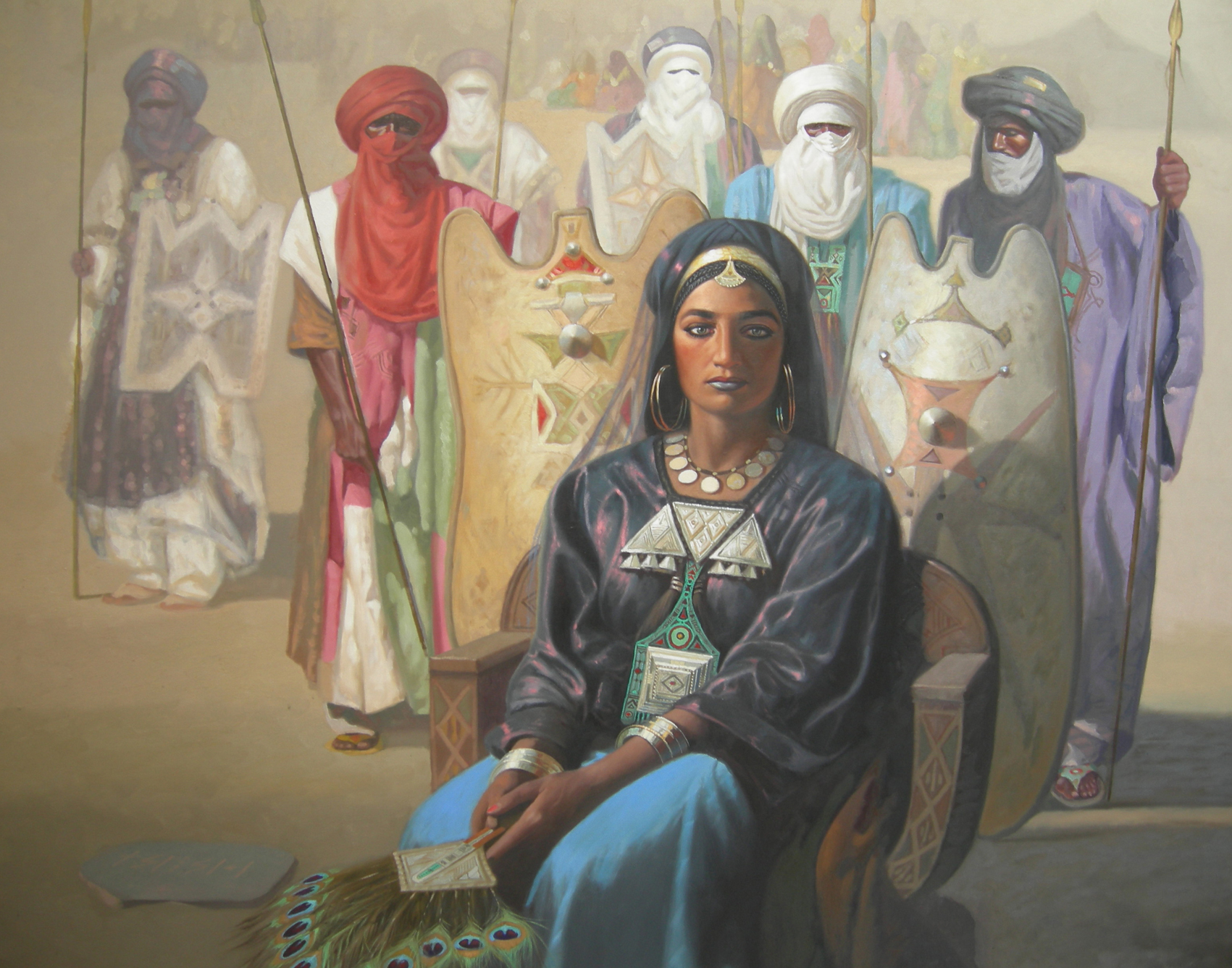
La Reine Tin Hinan, by Ziani, oil on canvas, 2007

=== Algeria ===
In 1979, he organized his first individual exhibition in an Algiers gallery, and then joined other artists to found the group of 35 which included M'hamed Issiakhem, Mohamed Temam, Mohammed Khadda, Denis Martinez, Ismaïl Samsom, Choukri Mesli, Ali Ali-Khodja, Hellal Zoubir, Ali Silem, Moussa Bourdine, Mohamed Louaïl, Ali Kerbouche and Tahar Ouamane.

In 1983, the Algerian government, under the chairmanship of Chadli Bendjedid, called on all national visual artists to found a museum dedicated to the history of the country. Ziani then contributed to this project through his works which are generally large format, and which will later enrich the collections of government or presidential institutions.

After a decade of production drawn from the historical theme, Ziani gradually turned away from specialization became interested in the theme of natural spaces, people and fantasies. He then favors free spaces treated in the blur, to give depth to his compositions, and this unlike historical canvases which are very crowded.

The themes of Ziani's paintings started to diversify, and in the spring of 1989, his wish to experiment with other techniques led him to learn lithography when he discovered an old press in one of the workshops of Villa Abd-el-Tif. With the help of his colleague Rachid Djemaï, he put the lithographic machine back into working order, andwith his friend Salah Hioun, painter and engraver, made his first printing tests.

=== Abroad ===
In 1992, he left for Paris when Islamist terrorism in Algeria set the country ablaze, where he met the art dealer Daniel Lasnon, running an art gallery. They started collaborating and in 1933 Lasnon organized for Ziani individual and collective exhibitions in Paris, Brussels and in several large cities of France. After his first Parisian exhibition in 1993, Ziani left Algiers and settled in Paris, then in September 1994 he moved to Strasbourg.

In 1997, Ziani joined the Opera Gallery run by businessman and art dealer Gilles Dyan, who presented his works internationally. In this time he won several artistic prizes, including the Prix de l'Académie des Beaux-Arts in Paris.

In 2003, he started collaboration with art dealer Victor Perahia who offered him the services of his gallery permanently exhibiting works by Salvador Dalí, Arman, Georges Braque, Louis Toffoli, Claude Weisbuch and others.

In 2010, Ziani along with Layachi Hamidouche, Tahar Ouamane, Rachid Djemaï and Noureddine Zekara represented Algeria at the international painting exhibition organized in South Africa by FIFA. He was responsible for training the group of five artists representing his native country.

In March and April 2013, the city of Chaumont organized a retrospective of his painting of various genres and subjects including the history of Algeria, Venice, still lifes and portraits or horses.

The city of Luxeuil-les-Bains asked Ziani in 2018 for his orientalist works, of which ten of his paintings joined those of Paul Élie Dubois at the Tour des Échevins museum to constitute an exhibition entitled ”Orientalism, crossed views between Paul-Elie Dubois and Hocine Ziani” that lasted from April till October 2019.

== Works ==
Ziani produced paintings in which he used a rich plastic vocabulary, where realism, hyperrealism, impressionism and semi-abstraction interact. Through a game of contrast between foreground and background, it's the burst of light that particularly characterizes his works.

In his works, he explores all the games of shadows and reflections, of contrasts and gradients. As a figurative painter, he creates paintings from the real world while drawing his artistic effects from the resources of the imagination.

Many of his works belong to collections of governmental and presidential institutions in Algeria, France, Morocco, United Arab Emirates, Venezuela, Cuba, Argentina, the royal family of Saudi Arabia, and are also present in private collections throughout the world.

Several of his painted works have been the subject of official acquisitions by several institutions, such as The National Museum of Fine Arts of Algiers, The Central Army Museum, Algiers, The Ministry of Culture, Algiers, The People's National Assembly, Algiers, The Artéum Contemporary Art Museum, Châteauneuf-le-Rouge (Aix-en-Provence), The City Museum of Schwarzach, Germany.

== Main exhibitions ==
Several galleries and exhibitions presented Ziani's works:

- Algiers: Galerie El-Mougar, 1st individual exhibition, 1979
- Algiers: Galerie El-Mougar, Groupe35, 1981
- Titograd: traveling exhibition Groupe35, 1983
- Sofia: Groupe35 exhibition, 1983
- Algiers: Palace of Culture, Bourdine group, Djemai, Kerbouche and Ziani, 1990
- Paris: Galerie de la Place, 1993, 1996, 2005
- Paris: Opera Gallery, 1998, 2000, 2002, 2008
- Paris: Galerie Art-Cadre, 2003, 2004, 2005, 2006, 2007
- Singapore: Opera Gallery, 1997, 1998, 2000, 2001, 2002
- Paris: Salon des Artistes Français, 1997, 1998, 1999, 2000, 2001
- New York: Opera Gallery, 2000, 2001
- Brussels: Brussels Stars Art Gallery, 1994
- Nîmes: South Gallery, 1995
- Luxembourg: Galerie Becker, 1998
- Saint-Dié: The European Biennial of the Thirty, 1998
- Heusden: Oocker Gallery, 2002
- Strasbourg: Galerie Froessel, 1993, 1995
- Aix-en-Provence: Arteum Museum, 2001
- Sharjah: Art Museum, 2005
- Roanne: Museum of Fine Arts, 2006
- Lyon: Art-Club gallery, ex-galerie de la Place, 2007
- Dubai: Opera Gallery, 2008, 2010
- Thonon-les-Bains: Franco-Swiss meeting, guest of honor, 2008
- Abu Dhabi: Authority for Culture and Heritage, 2009
- Brandérion Cap'Orient: The Great Figuratives in Brittany, 2009
- Zillisheim: Salon International, guest of honor, 2009
- Johannesburg: representation of Algeria at the international exhibition of countries qualified for the FIFA World Cup - FIFA, 2010
- Endingen: Internationale Kunstmesse, guest of honor, 2010
- Paris: 13th Salon des Peintres du Marais, guest of honor, 2011
- Kaysersberg: Atmosphere of Venice, thematic exhibition, 2012
- Strasbourg: St-Art, one-man-show, Art-Cadre Gallery, 2012
- Chaumont: at the Chapelle des Jésuites, retrospective organized by the city of Chaumont, 2013
- Strasbourg: Orient and Venice, Galerie de l'Agora, Council of Europe, 2013
- Paris: Ad Vitam Aeternam, group exhibition (Brayer, Buffet, Dali, Laporte, Tobiasse, Toffoli, Weisbuch, Ziani), Pérahia gallery, 2014
- Rosheim, France: solo exhibition "Praise of Wisdom", 2015
- Schwarzach, Germany: at the Church of St. Peter and Paul, solo exhibition "The spirit of wine", 2017
- Luxeuil-les-Bains, Art dans la Rue fair, guest of honor, 2017
- Vittel: Vittel international painting and sculpture exhibition, guest of honor, 2018
- Nogent: Salon Epon'Arts, guest of honor, 2019
- Duttlenheim: Art67, 5th biennial, edition sponsored by Ziani, 2019
- Luxeuil-les-Bains: Exhibition at the Musée de la Tour des Echevins, "Orientalism, crossed views between Paul-Elie Dubois and Hocine Ziani", 2019
- Colombier: 26th Salon d’Art, 2020.

== Awards ==
- Diploma of Honor, awarded by Algerian President Chadli Bendjedid, Algiers, 1987.
- Charles Ernest Beulé Prize from the Académie des Beaux-Arts, Paris, 1997.
- Several times medalist at the Salon of the Société des Artistes Français, Paris, 1997–1999.
- Gold medal, Salon International, Vittel, 1998.
- First Grand Prix, Salon des Seigneurs de l'Art, Arles, 1998.
- First Grand Prix, Grand Gala National, Nantes, 1999.
- First Grand Prix, gold medal, Salon International, La Grande-Motte, 2000.
- Prize awarded by the Arts-Sciences-Lettres Academic Society, Paris.
- Medal of the City of Paris, 2019.

== See also ==
- List of Algerian people
- List of Algerian artists
- Figurative art
- Orientalism
- Contemporary art
- National Museum of Fine Arts of Algiers

== Bibliography ==
- Catalogue Exposition au Palais de la Culture, Alger 1990.
- Catalogue Peinture algérienne contemporaine, Alger 1992.
- Catalogue Rétrospective 92, Alger 1992.
- Dernières Nouvelles d'Alsace, Julie Carpentier, "l'Algérie de Hocine Ziani, 1995 (No. 103).
- Tassili Magazine, No. 26, juin-aout 2001, p. 48-54, "Ziani, la douceur poétique des choses humbles", par Ali El-Hadj Tahar.
- Les artistes de l'Algérie, Élisabeth Cazenave, Éditions Bernard Giovanangeli. 2001, ISBN 978-2909034270
- Abdelkader le magnanime, Bruno Étienne et François Pouillon, Collection Découvertes, Éditions Gallimard./IMA, 2003.
- Arts Actualités, magazine, mars 2003, p. 64, "Ziani, l'Esprit berbère", par Thierry Sznytka.
- Beaux-Arts Magazine, hors série, "l'Algérie des Peintres, de Delacroix à Renoir", p. 8, 2003.
- Dictionnaire des artistes modernes et contemporains, Drouot Cotation, Éditions 2001 et 2002.
- Ziani, les lumières de l'histoire, entretiens avec François Pouillon, CPS Éditions, Alger 2002.
- Arts Actualités, magazine, No. 133, p. 64, mars 2003. Hocine Ziani, l'Esprit berbère, par Thierry Sznytka.
- Abd el-Kader, le magnanime, de Bruno Étienne et François Pouillon. p. 33, 93, 94 et 95. Editions Gallimard 2003. ISBN 2-07-076749-3.
- Dictionnaire Culturel de l'Orientalisme, p.6, de Christine Peltre, Editions Hazan, Paris. ISBN 2 85025 882 2, septembre 2003
- Orientalisme, Christine Peltre, p. 240. ISBN 2-87939-279-9. Editions Terrail, 2004.
- Les Plus Belles Enveloppes Illustrées, Pierre-Stéphane Proust, Éditions Normandie Terre des Arts. ISBN 2-909713-10-5. Décembre 2004.
- Les plus belles enveloppes illustrées, Pierre-Stéphane Proust, p. 51, décembre 2004, ISBN 2-909713-10-5
- Explorations artistiques au Sahara, Elisabeth Cazenave. Editions Ibis Press, ISBN 2-910728-50-1, novembre 2005. p. 105, 150, 153.
- Abd El-Kader, édition en danois, par A.W. Dinesen. décembre 2006. ISBN 87-7695-030-1
- Dessins et Peintures, magazine No. 14, mai-juin 2008, p. 18-25, Ziani, la magie d'une lumière venue du sud, article d'Andrée Maennel.
- Commander of the Faithful, John W. Kiser. p. 68. ISBN 978-09798828-3-8. Editions Monkfish, 2008.
- Diwan Al Fen, dictionnaire des Peintres, Sculpteurs et Designers Algériens de Djamila Flici guendil, ed. enag-Anep, Alger 2008.
- L’art en Algérie, répertoire bibliographique 1844- 2008 de Saadia Sebbah et Mansour Abrous, ed. Casbah, Alger 2009.
- Abdelkader, Un spirituel dans la modernité, Aya Sakkal, Éditions Albouraq, 2010.
- Mémoire algérienne, Achour Cheurfi, Dictionnaire biographique, Éditions Dahleb, 2011.
- Histoire de la peinture en Algérie : continuum et ruptures, Anissa Bouayed, 2012.
- Le cheval algérien, Claire Veillères, juin 2013, ISBN 979-10-92691-00-9.
- Dictionnaire Biographique des peintres algériens, Mansour Abrous, Alger, 2014.
- Carrefours d'Alsace, revue No. 1025, juillet-aout 2015, page 11, texte de Bertrand Schlund.
- Représenter l'Algérie, Nicholas Schaub. p. 135-136, 138. ISBN 978-2-7355-0845-7 cths INHA, 2015.
- Gmünder Sterne, magazine en allemand, 2015, "Das Lüchtlingskind Jesus", texte du curé de paroisse Robert Kloker.
- Pratique des Arts, magazine, No. 131, décembre 2016 - janvier 2017, page 60, texte de Jean-Pierre Parlange.
- Univers des Arts, magazine, No. 190, été 2017, p. 76. 30e Festival International d'Art à Luxeuil-les-Bains.
- Art Animalier, le cheval dans l'art contemporain, Editions Abbate-Piolé, mars 2018, ISBN 978-2-917500-22-4.
- Abdelkader, sous la direction de François Pouillon, Editions Snoeck, février 2019, ISBN 9789461614896. Catalogue exposition Musée la Piscine, Roubaix.

== Monograph ==
- François Pouillon (2003). Ziani, les lumières de l'histoire. CPS Éditions. p. 194 pages. ISBN 9961-771-001.
