= Rajaouna =

Mountain in Tizi Ouzou, Algeria

Rajaouna Mountain or Baluwa Mountain
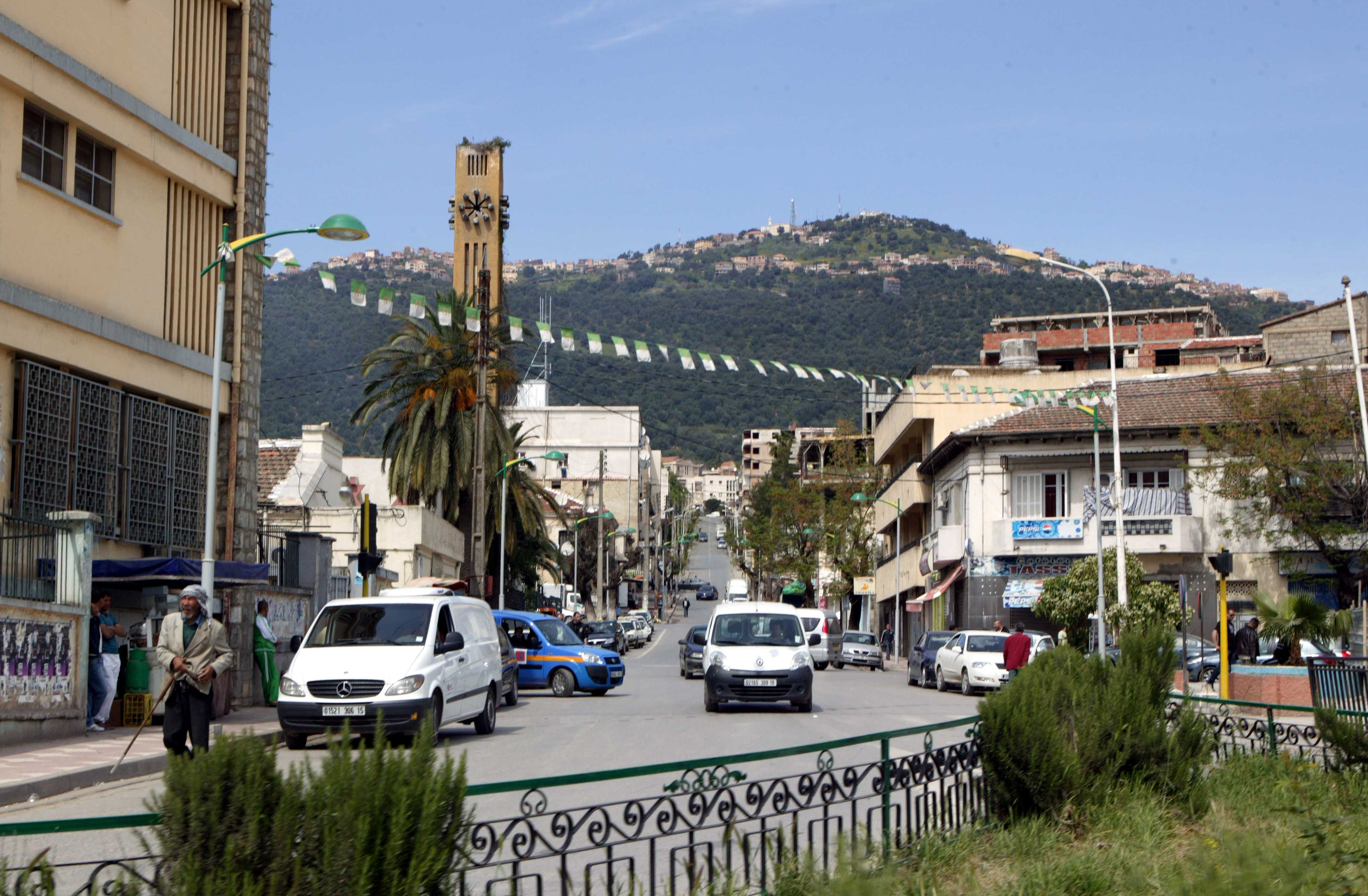
- Rajaouna Mountain

Highest point
- Elevation: 650 m (2,130 ft)
- Coordinates: 36.7332677°N 4.0646708°E

Geography
- Tizi Ouzou Province Algeria
- Parent range: Djurdjura Mountains – Tell Atlas

Geology
- Rock age: Tertiary – Oligocene

Rajaouna Mountain (or Baluwa Mountain) is a peak in the Djurdjura mountain range in the Tell Atlas in Algeria, located in the Tizi Ouzou, Tizi Ouzou District, Tizi Ouzou Province of the Kabylia region of Algeria.

== Description ==
Rajaouna Mountain is a peak in Tizi-Ouzou Province, with an altitude of 650 m (2,133 ft), overlooking the south of the city of Tizi-Ouzou, and facing Mount Hasnawa and Mount Issa Mimoun within the Djurdjura Mountains.

== History ==
Before the French occupation of Algeria, Rajaouna Mountain was home to a Turkish fortress built 261 meters (856 feet) above sea level.

Before 1830, the Regency of Algiers built this castle from the Sultan's House in the Casbah of Algiers in order to monitor the Kingdom of Kuku.

A significant part of the Kabylia region was not under the authority of the Dey in Algiers, with the Ait Abbas fortress as its command center.

During the French army's invasion of Tizi Ouzou, a fierce battle was fought around this fortress in June 1845, known as the Battle of Rajaouna.

The Rajaouna Heights also witnessed clashes between the Algerian National Liberation Army and the French Army during the Algerian Liberation Revolution, where the Algerians had many hideouts located at this height and its foothills.

== Geology ==
The formation of Rajaouna Mountain dates back to the Tertiary of the Cenozoic era on the geologic timescale.

The presence of sedimentation of sandstone, puddingstone and breccia around Baluwa Mountain has indicated that the uplift was formed during the Oligocene period.

Archaeological and paleontological discoveries have further confirmed this geological hypothesis.

The site of the current Albor village lies on a solid bed of mica schist and gneiss.

The top of the mountain is composed of metamorphic rock, and its foothills are composed of archean-old schist and clay schist.

== Water ==
Rajaouna Mountain has an artesian well as well as several springs.

After collecting rainwater and snowmelt, the mountain's reefs supply the Sebaou Valley, which surrounds the ridge to the east, north, and west as it descends toward its estuary in Boumerdès Province.

These reefs from the mountain also flow into the valley of Oued Sebt.

== Transportation ==
Rajaouna Mountain can be reached via the following national roads:

- National Road 12.
- National Road 72.

Transportation to this mountain is available through a network of public transportation:

- Teleferic Rajauna.
- Bohinon land Station.
- Boukhalfa train station.
- Tizi Ouzou train station.
- Wadi Issa train station.

== Forests ==
The heights of Rajaouna Mountain are surrounded by a diverse vegetation cover centered on two forests:

- Harouza forest.
- Baluwa Forest.

== Villages and districts ==
Rajaouna Mountain has two main villages:

- Rajaouna Tasht village.
- Rajaouna Albor Village.

It also overlooks several districts of Tizi Ouzou municipality, including:

- Boukhalfa.
- Tala Allam.
- Temizar Leghbar.
- Bouhinon.

== Religious activities ==
=== Mosques ===
This area contains many mosques that are supervised by the Directorate of Religious Affairs and Endowments of Tizi Ouzou under the tutelage of the Ministry of Religious Affairs and Endowments.

- Lala Saida Mosque.

=== Zawiyas ===
- Sidi Baloua Zawawi

== Ecological diversity ==
=== Trees ===
Many types of trees surround Rajaouna Mountain within the forests of the Baluwa and Harouza .

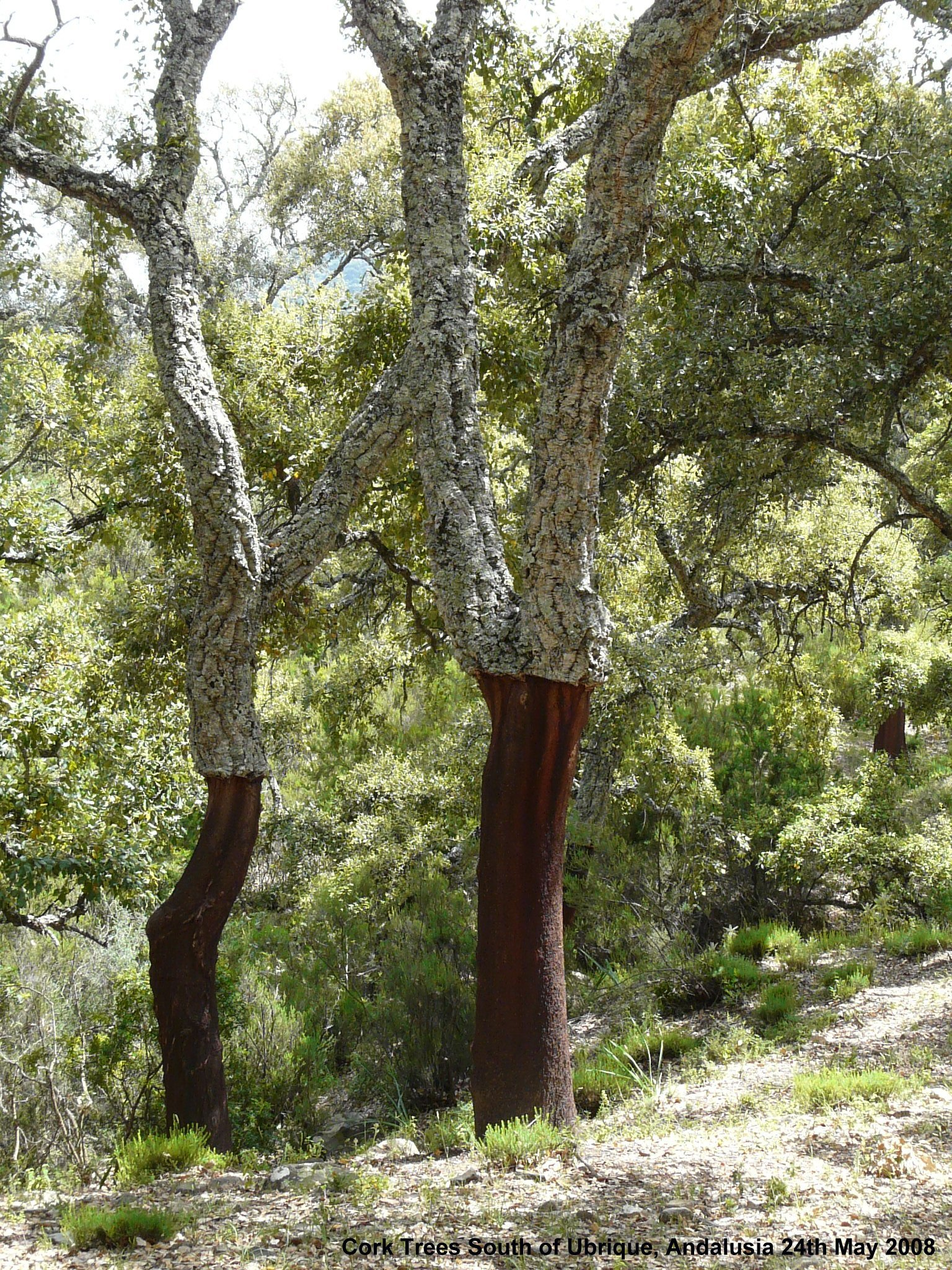
Quercus suber

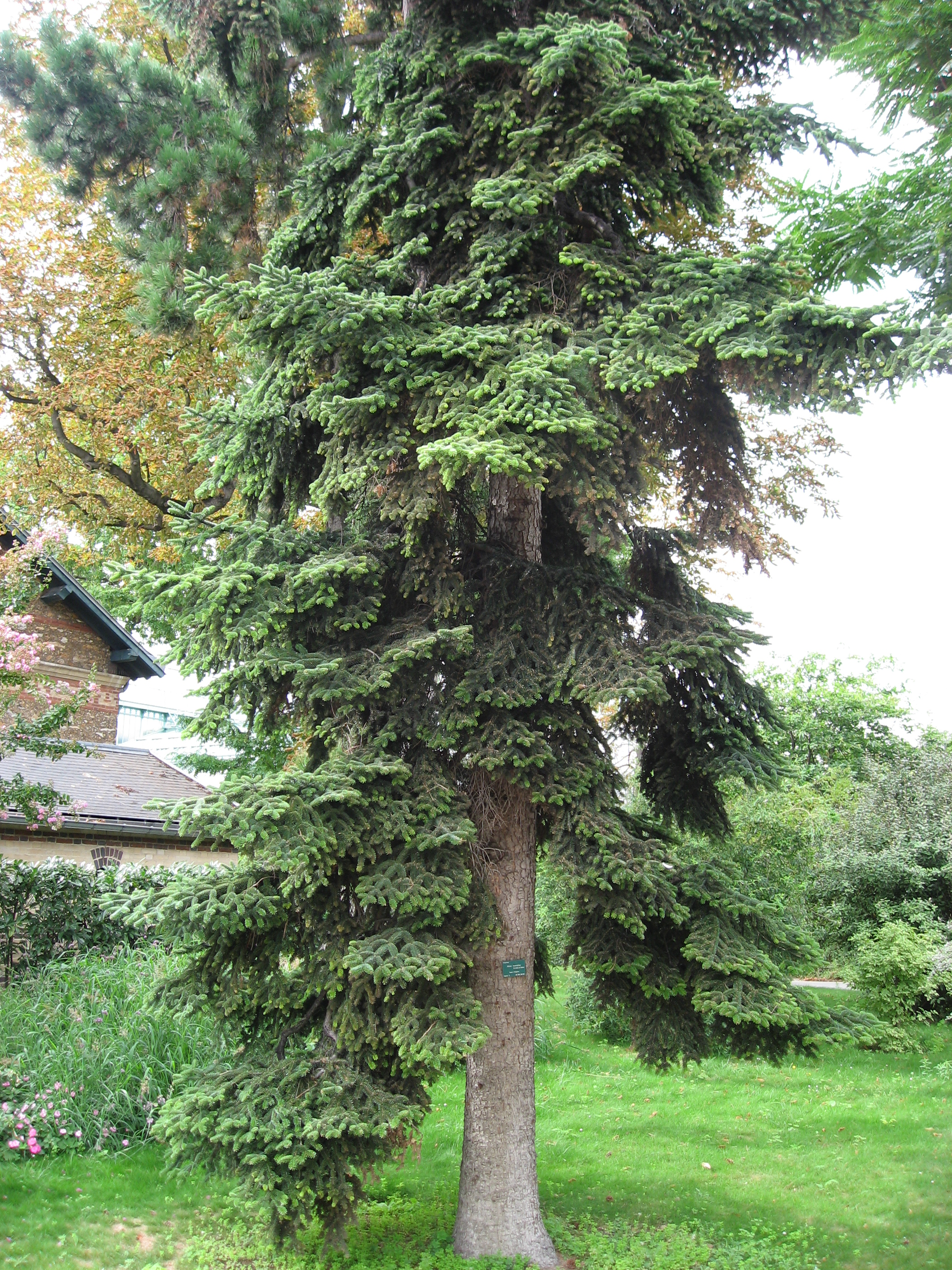
Abies numidica

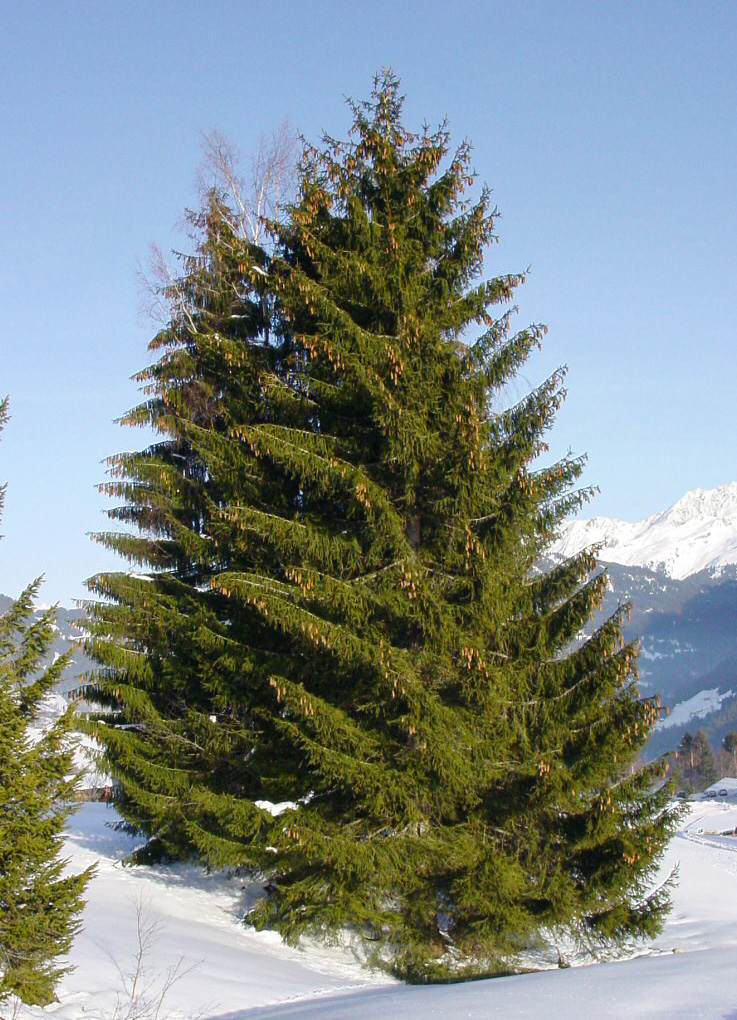
Fir

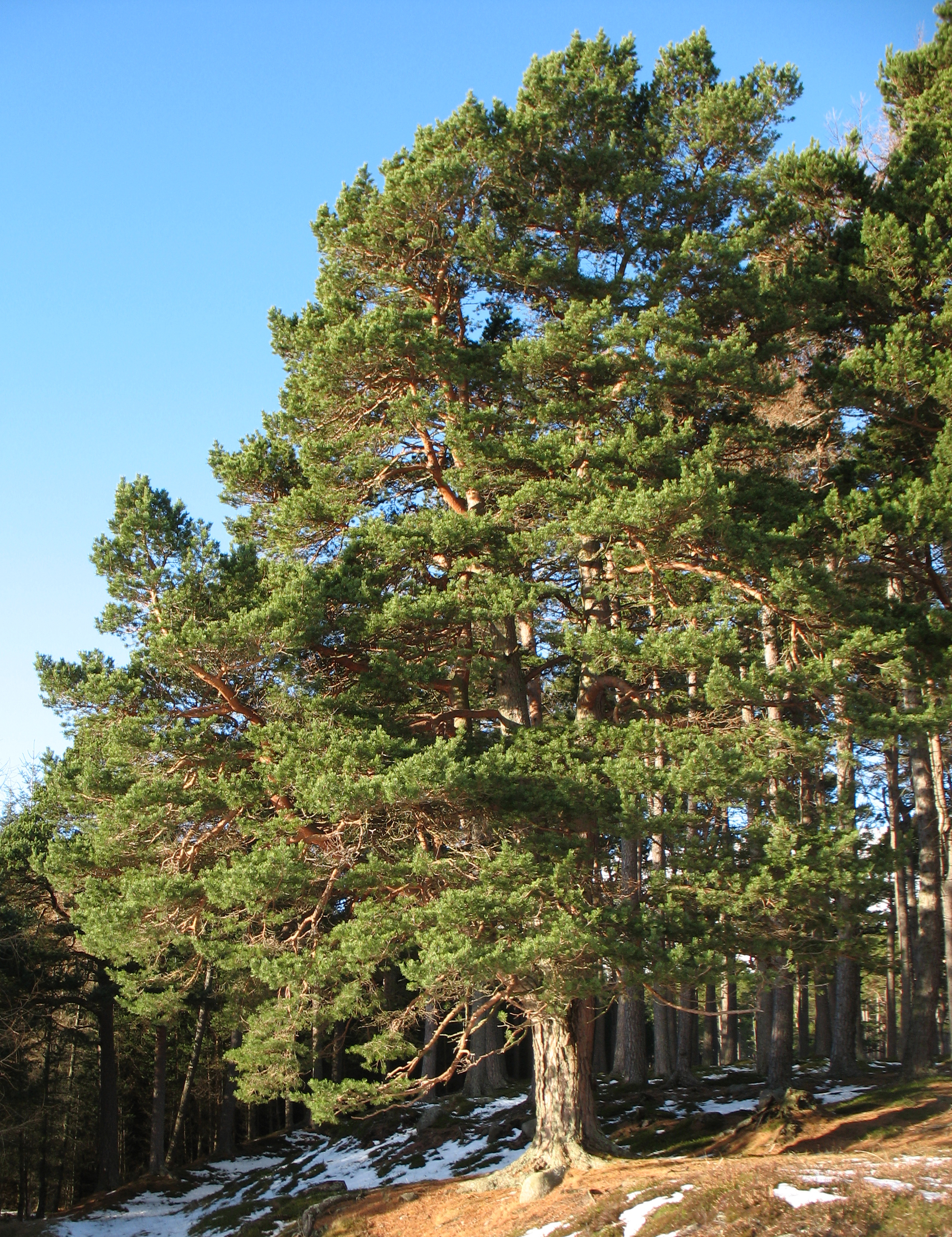
Pinus sylvestris

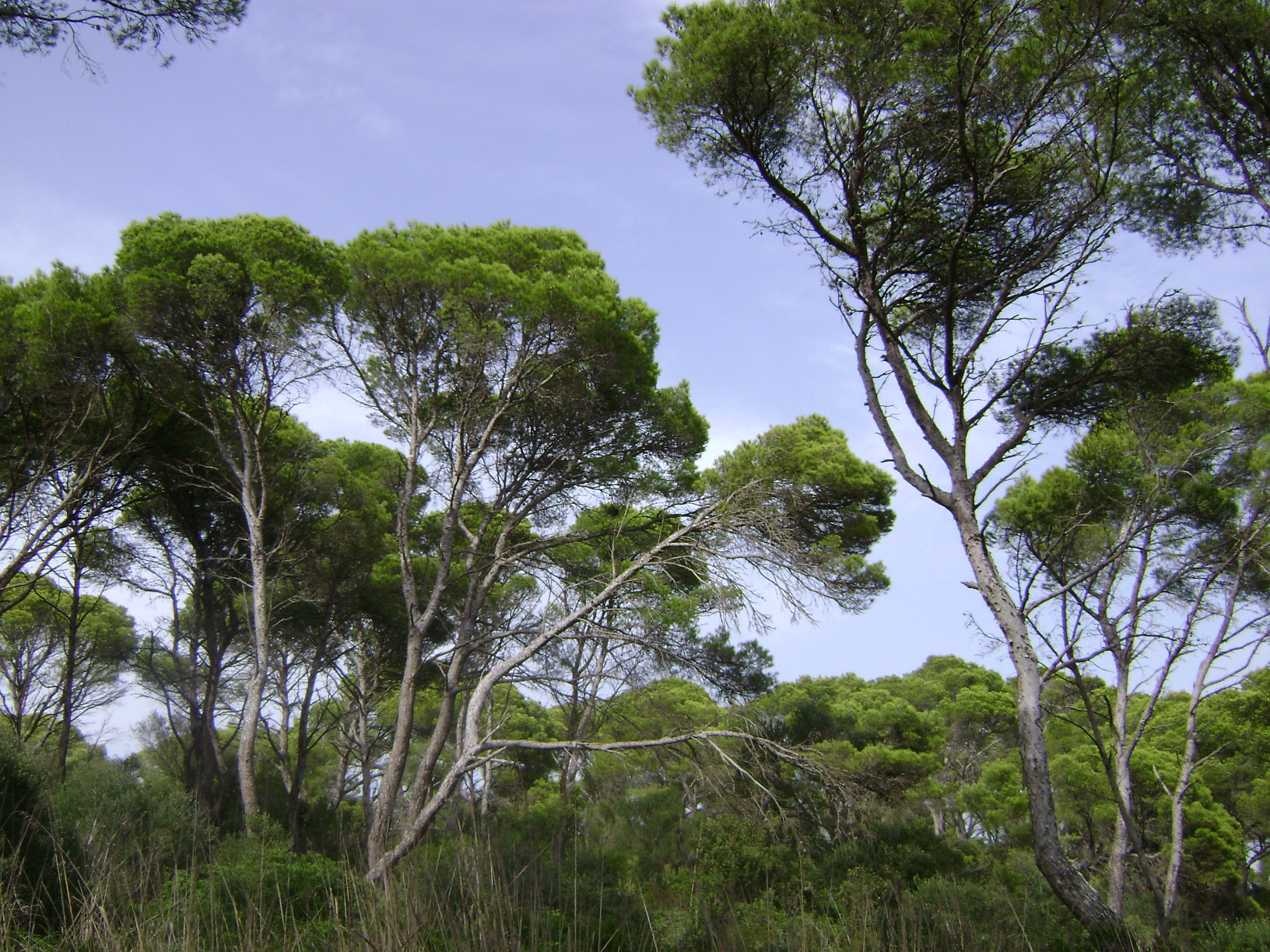
Pinus halepensis

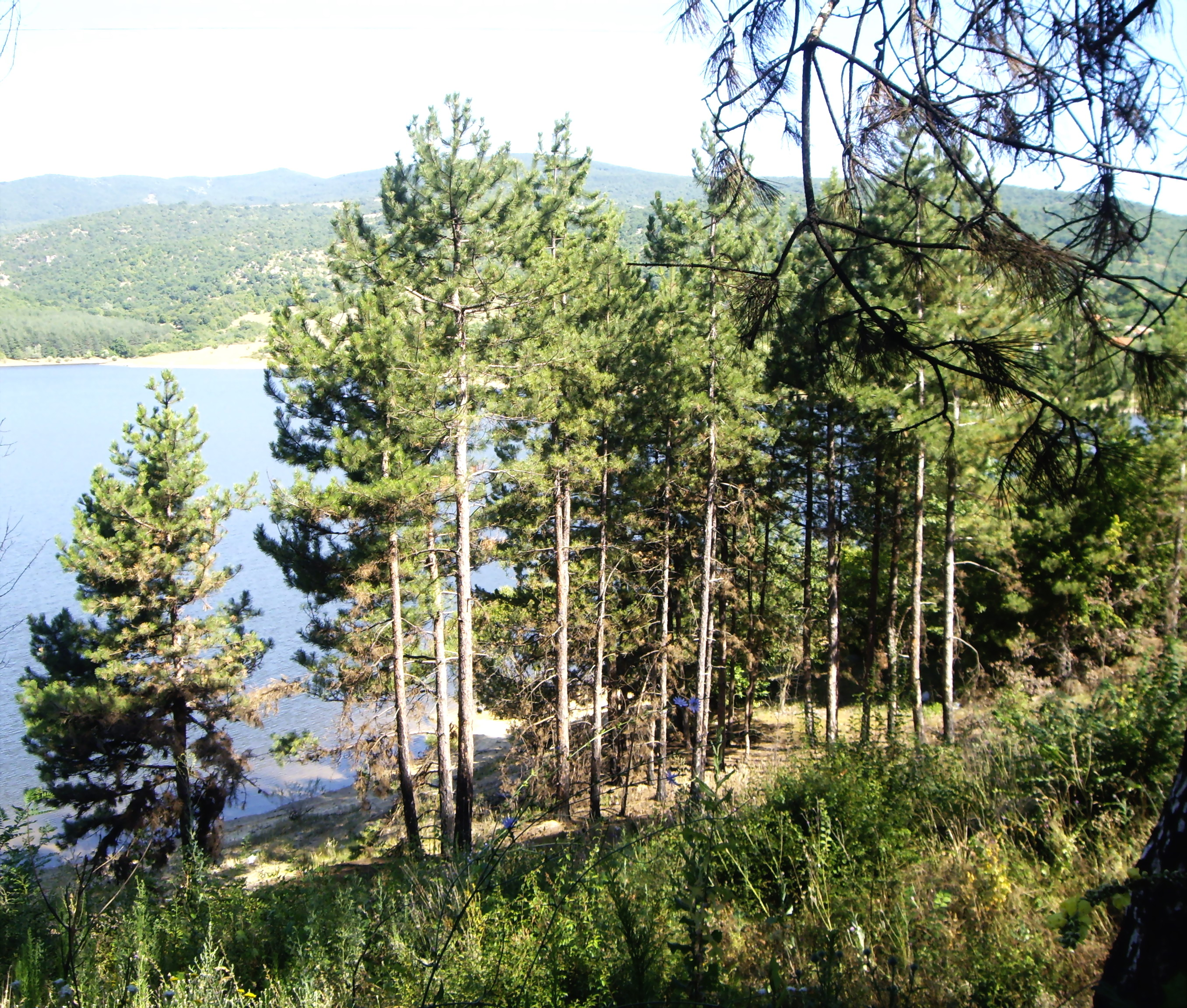
Pinus nigra

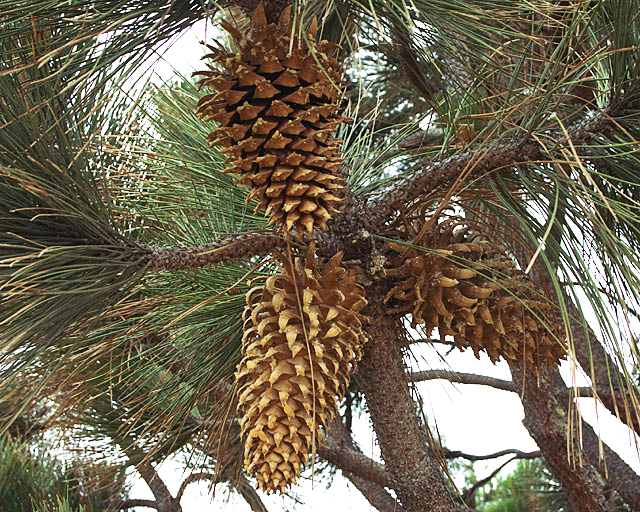
Coulter pine

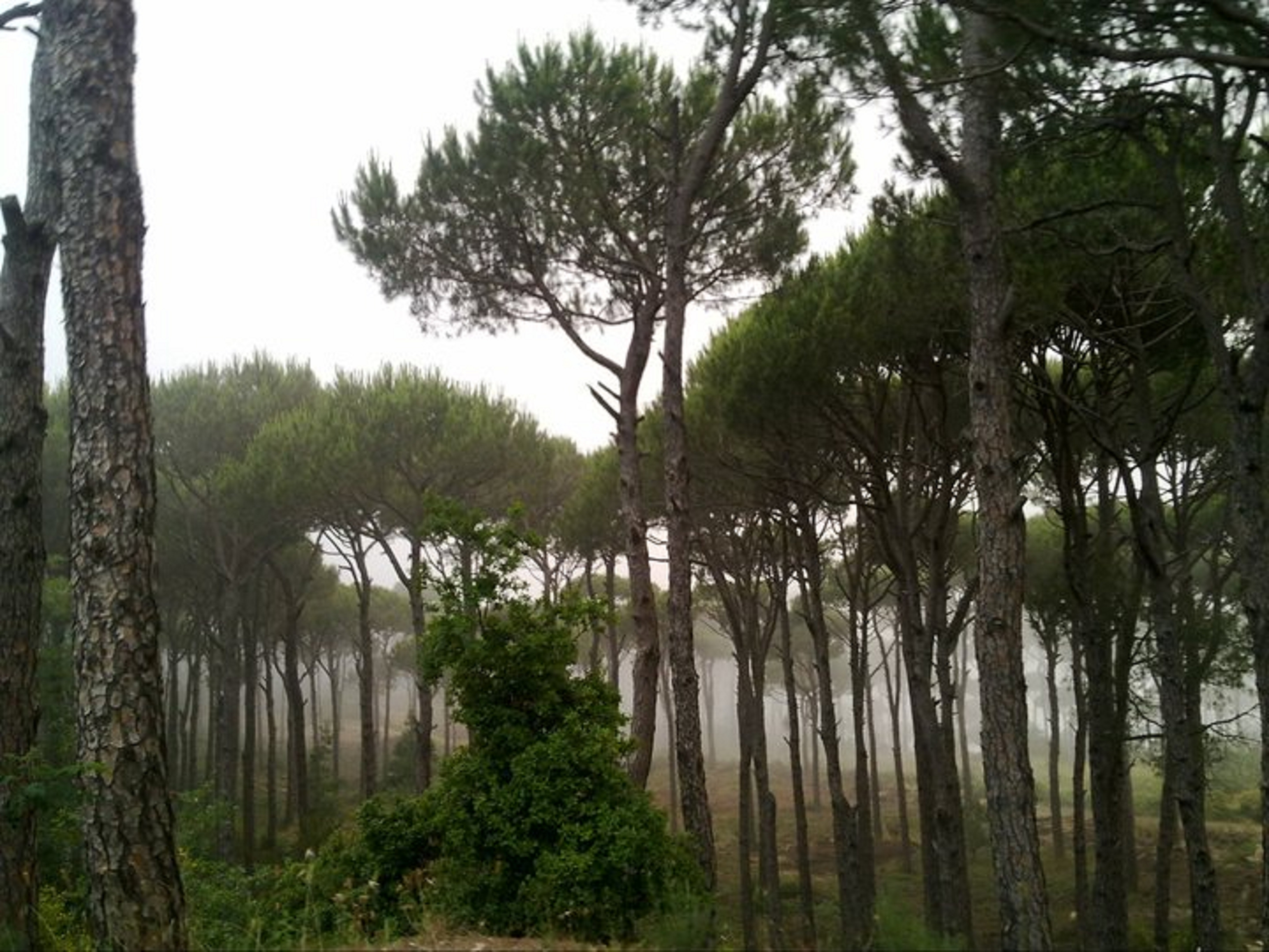
Stone pine

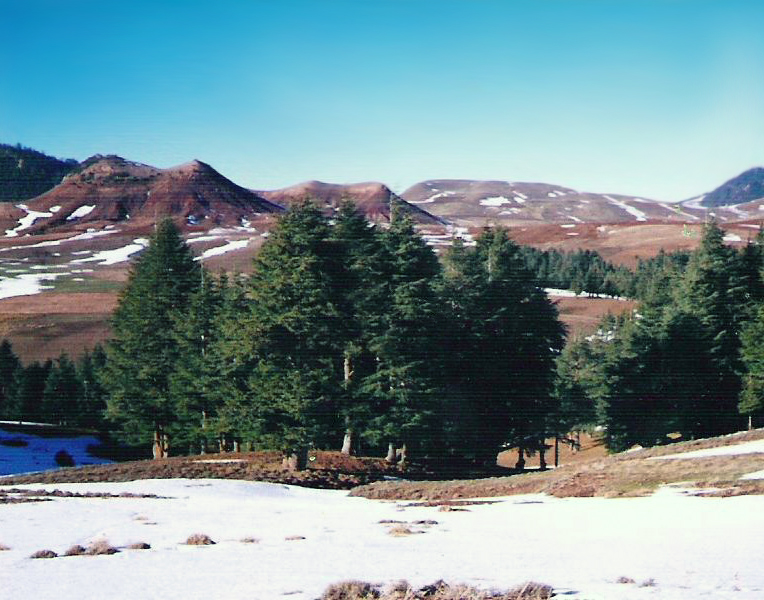
Cedrus atlantica

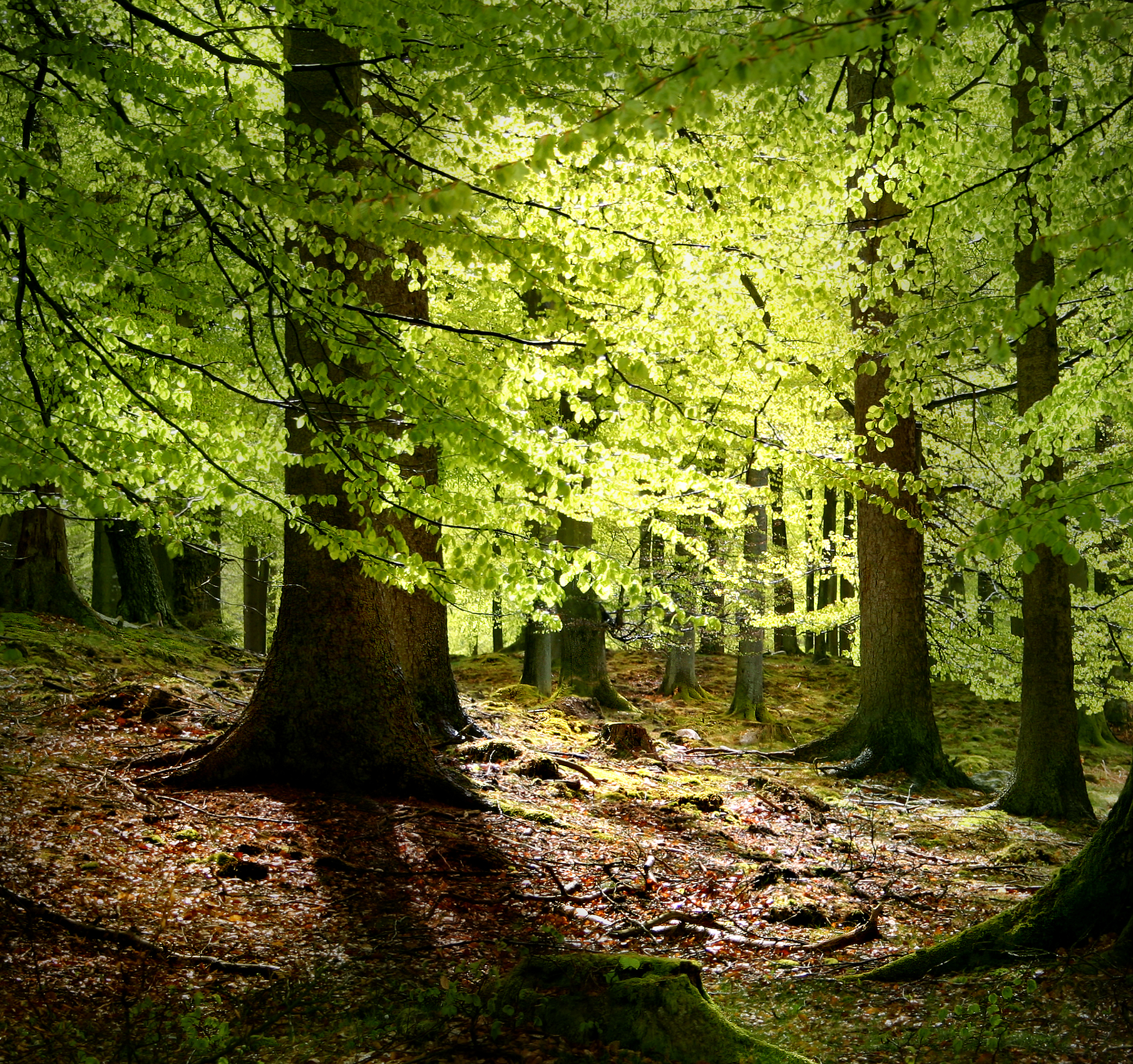
Fagus sylvatica

=== Animals ===
Many species of mammals live in Rajaouna Mountain in the forests of the Baluwa and Harouza.

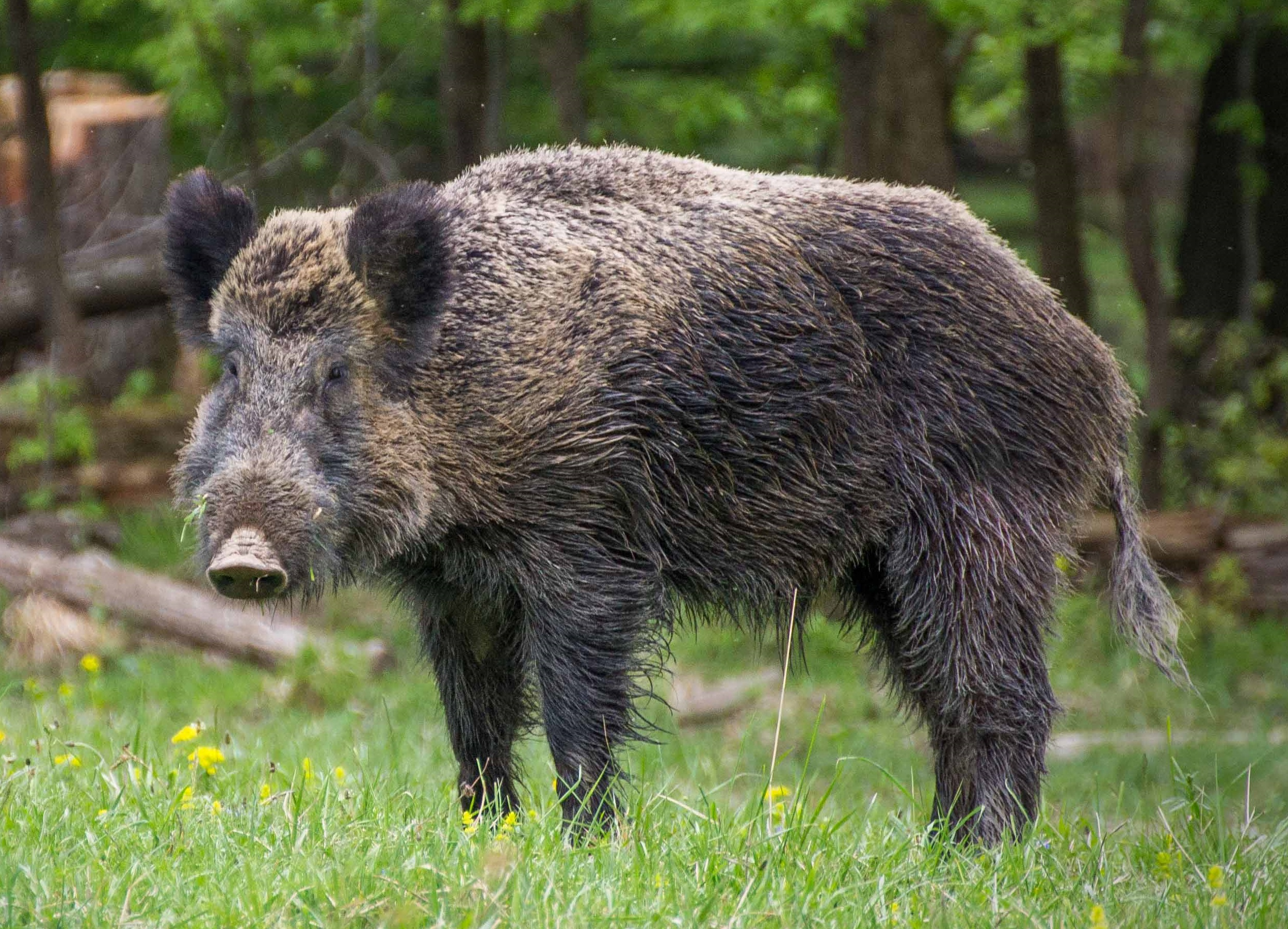
Wild boar

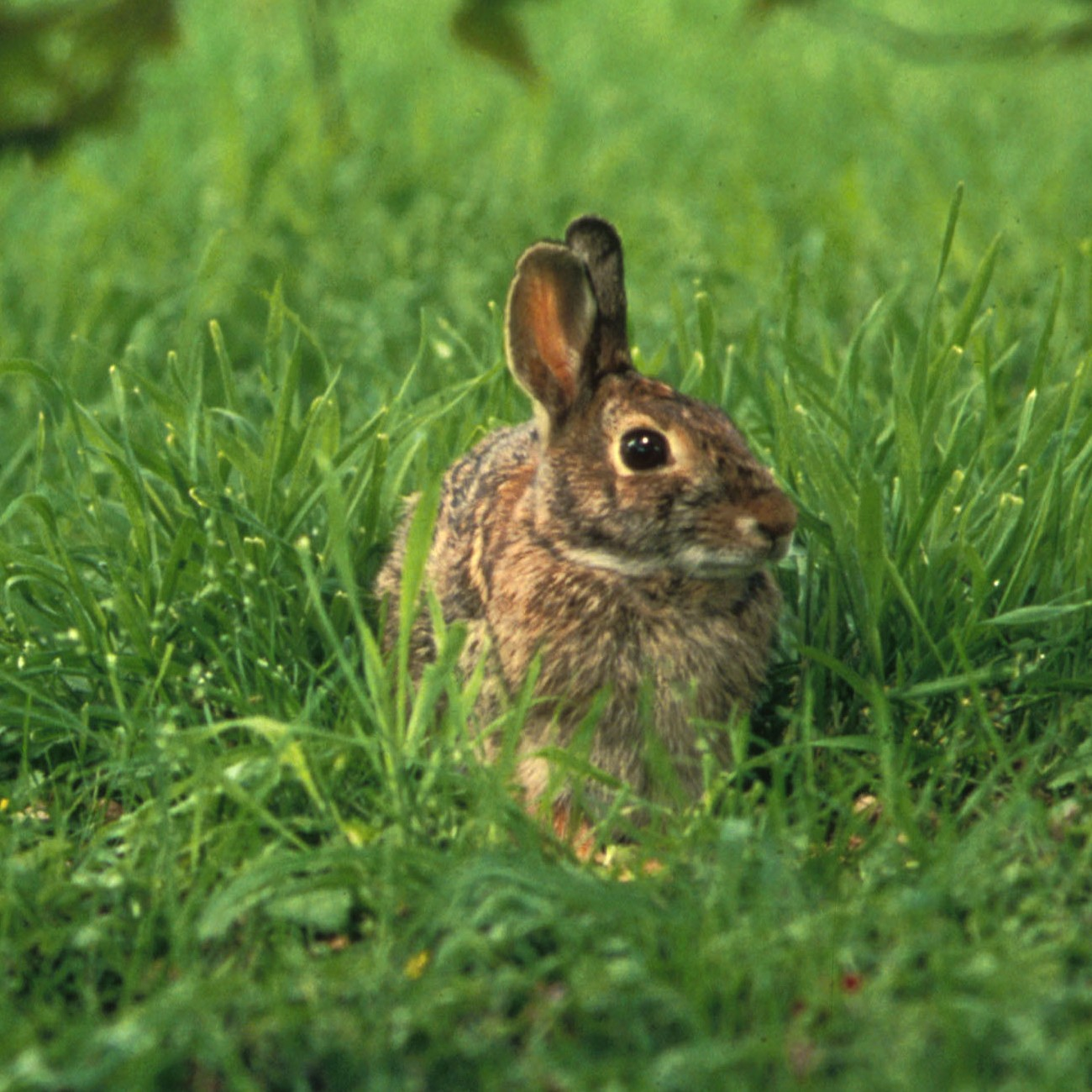
Rabbit

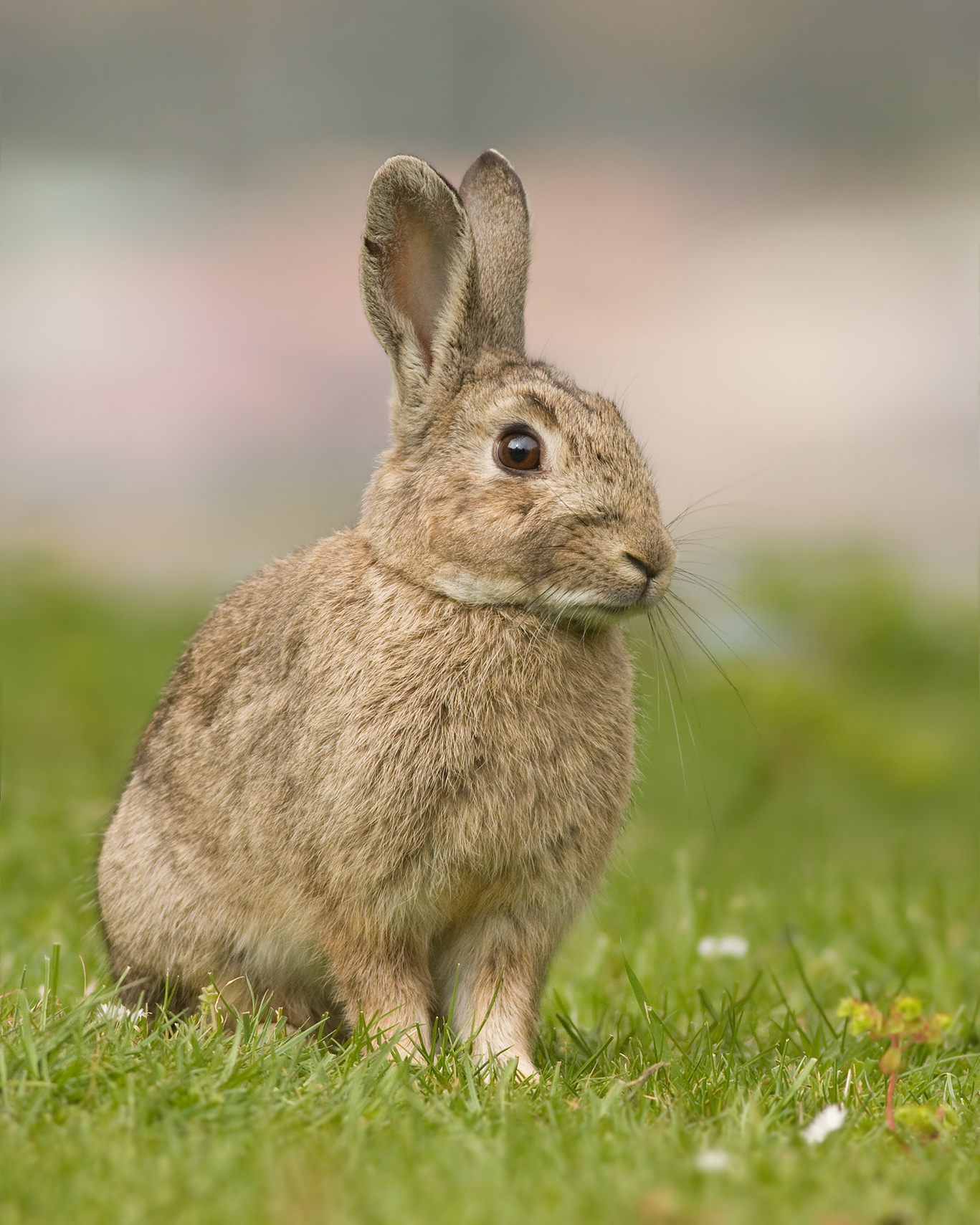
European rabbit

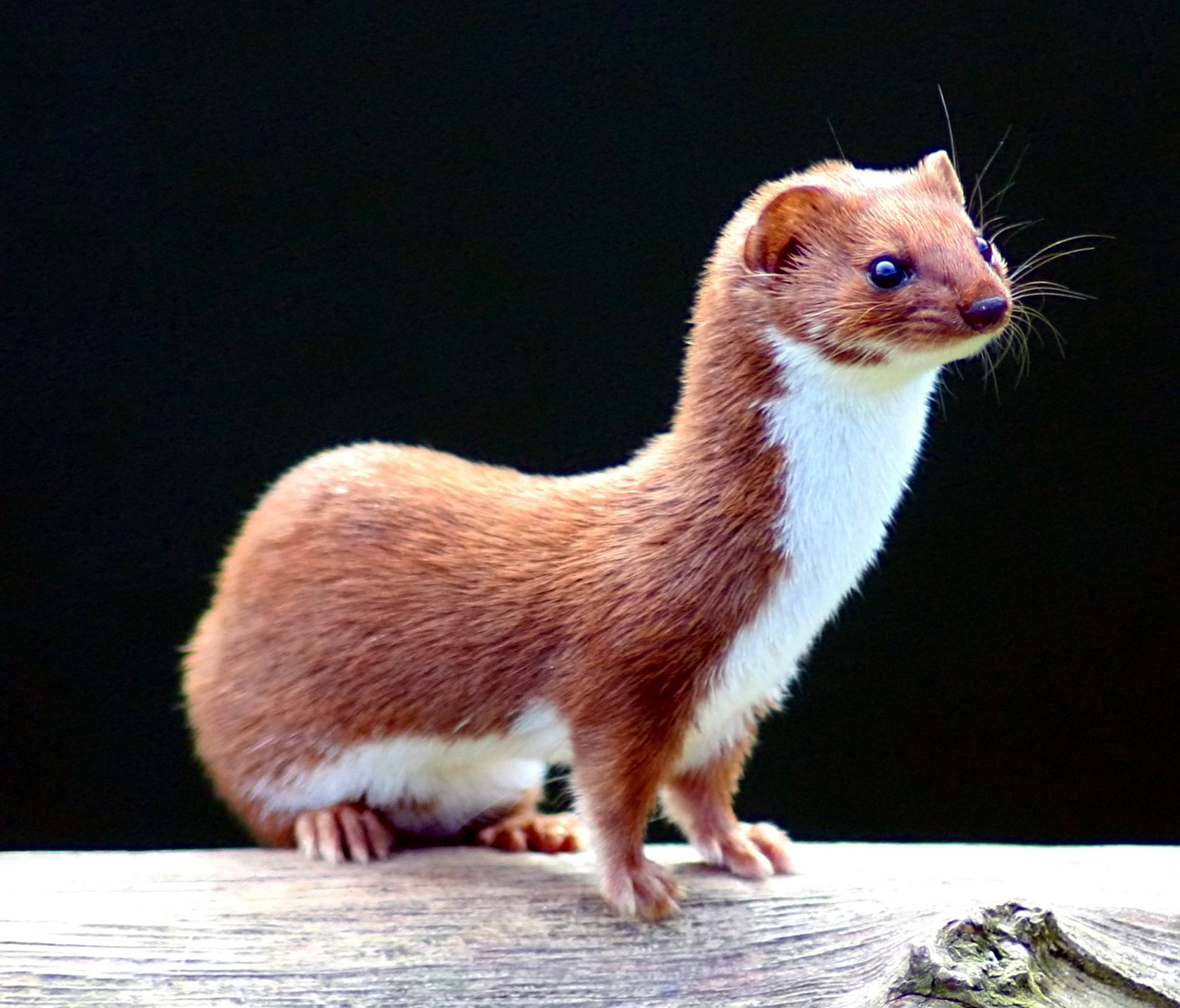
Least weasel

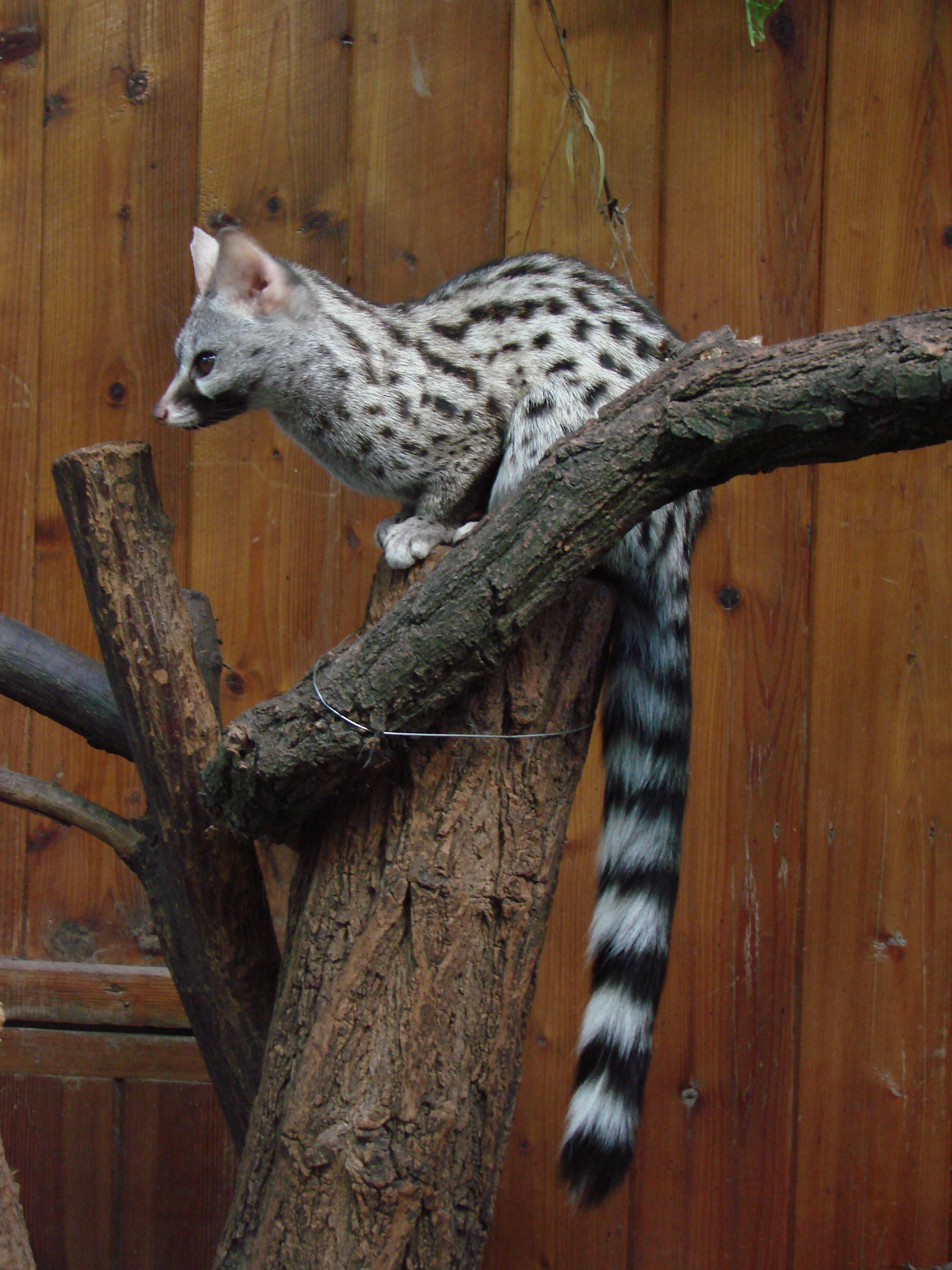
Common genet

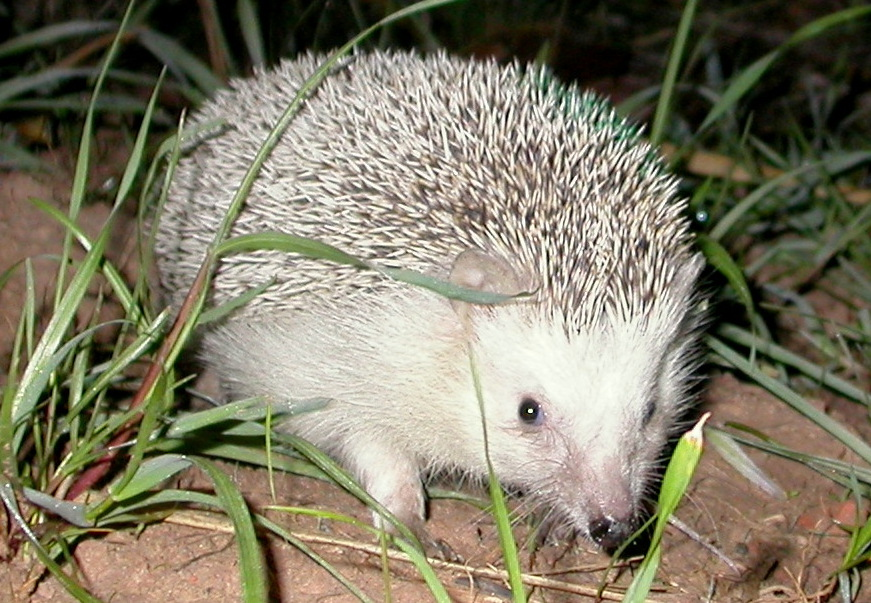
North African hedgehog

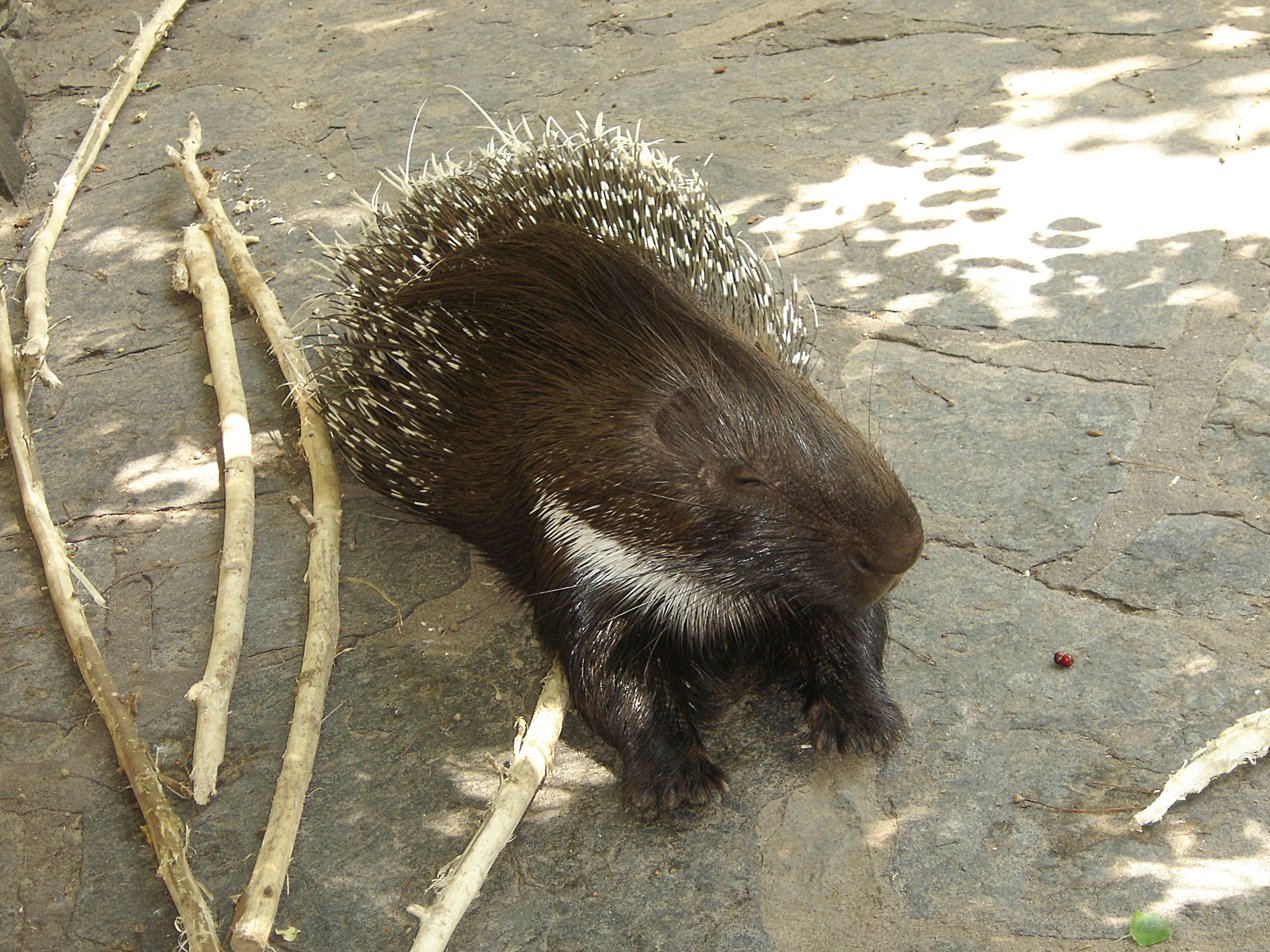
Porcupine

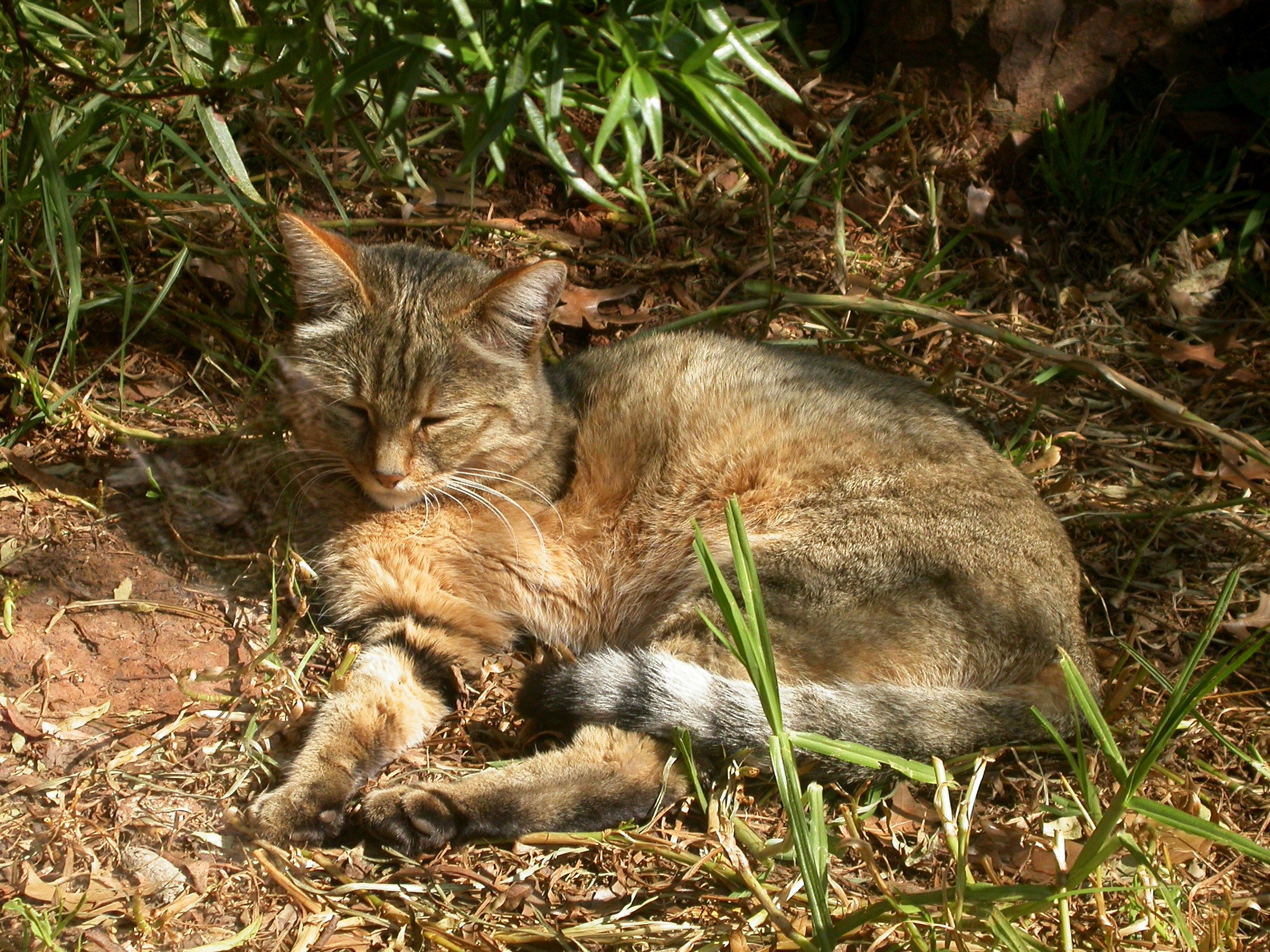
Wildcat

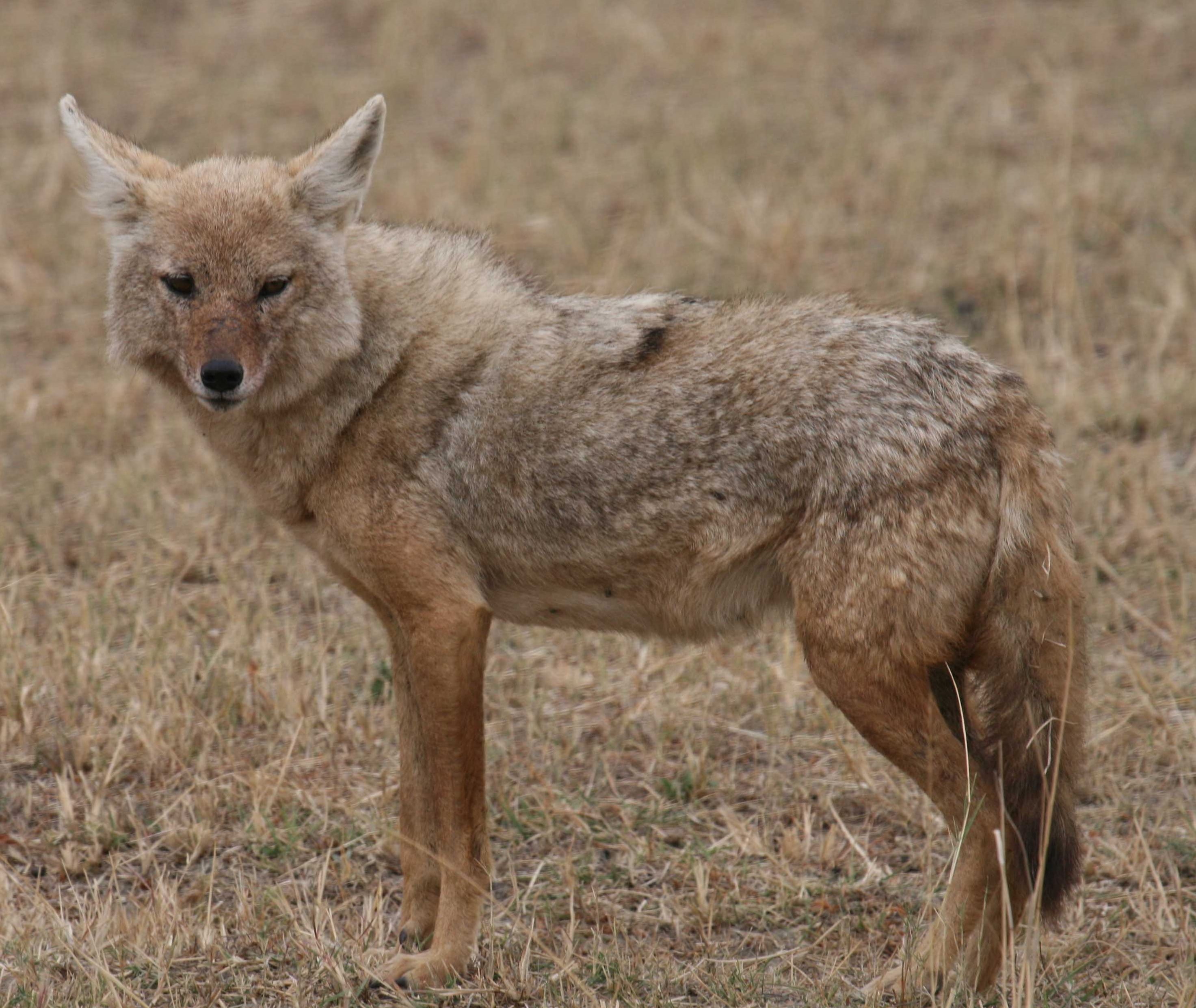
African wolf

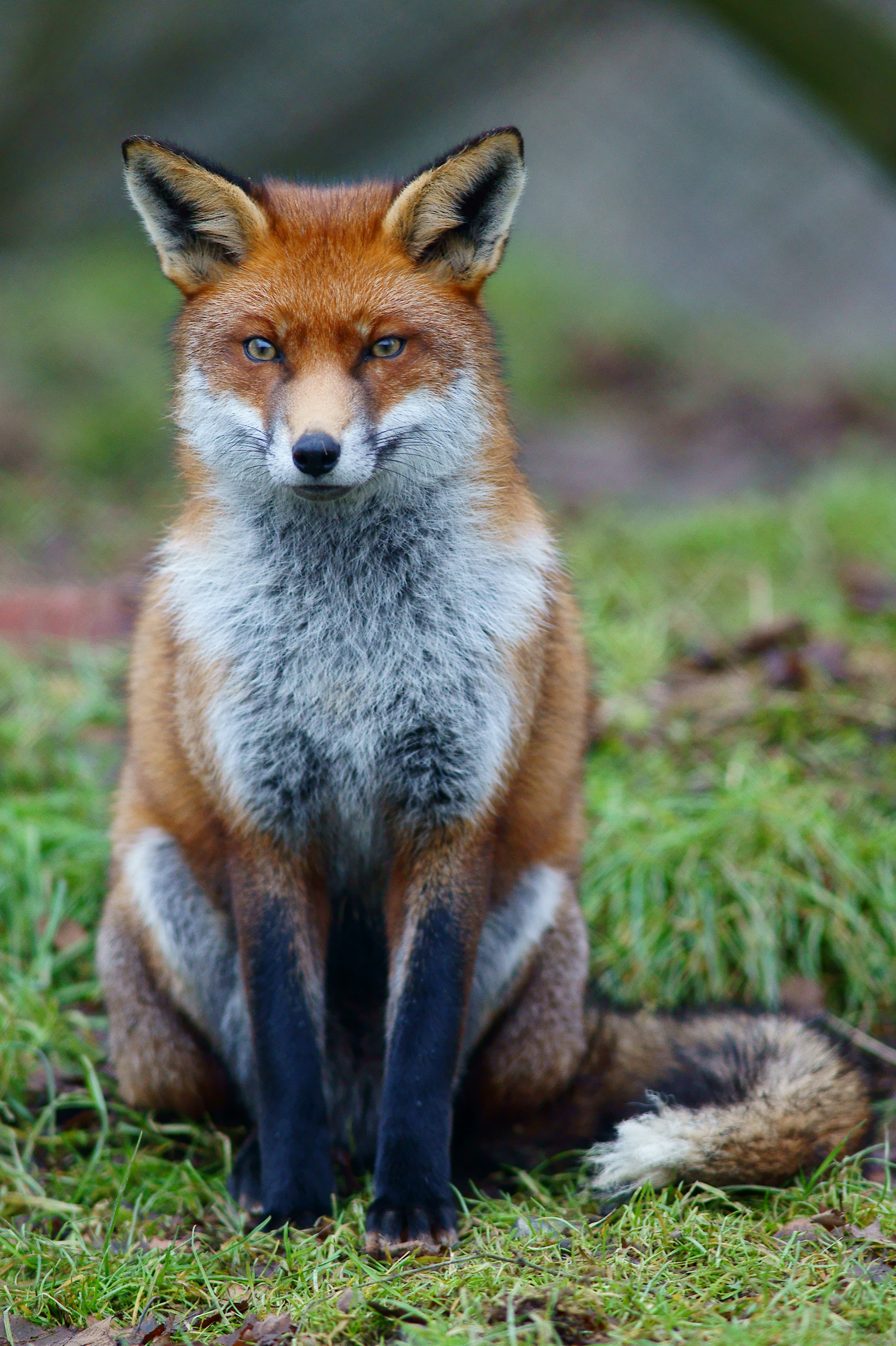
Red fox

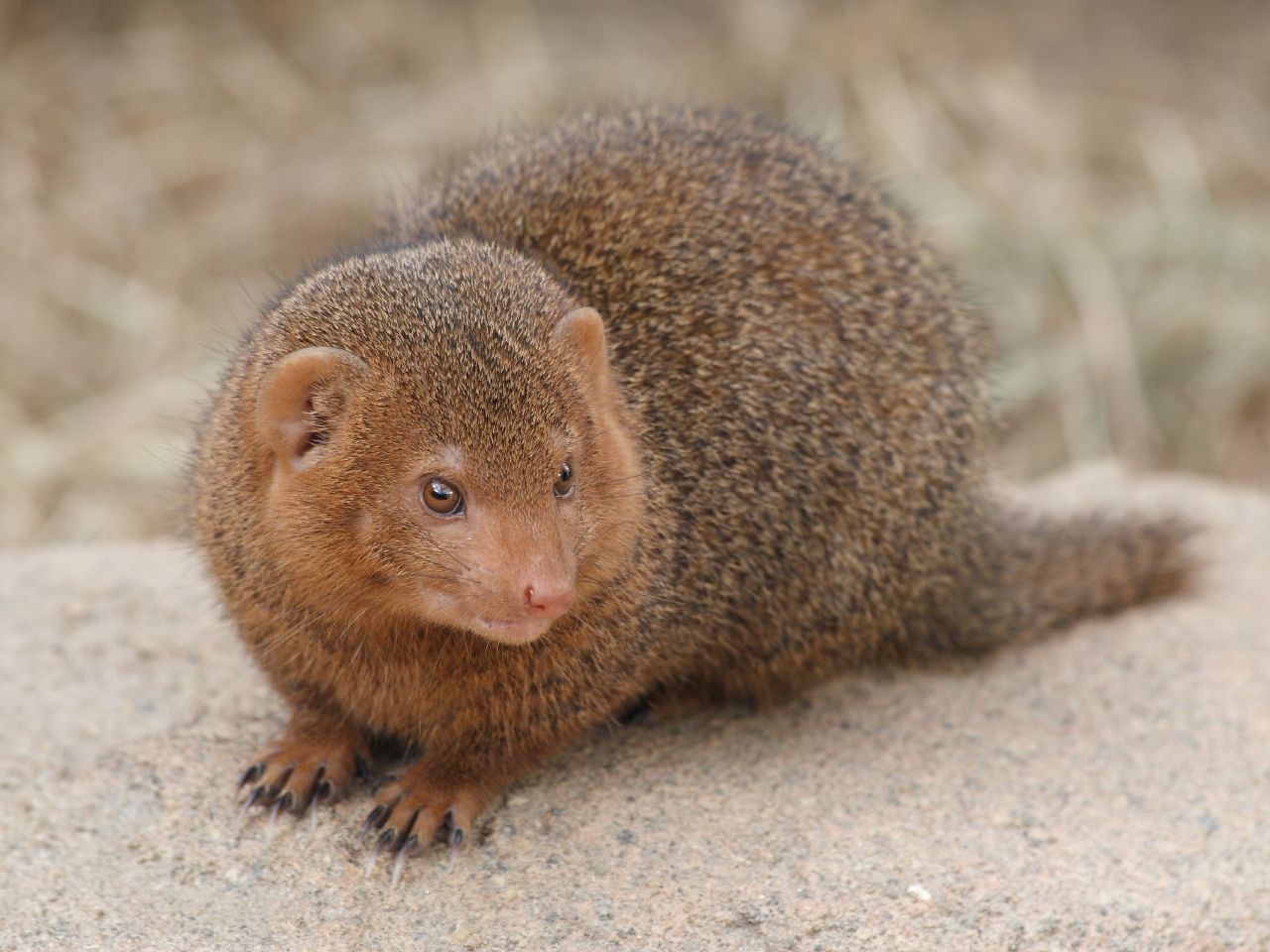
Mongoose

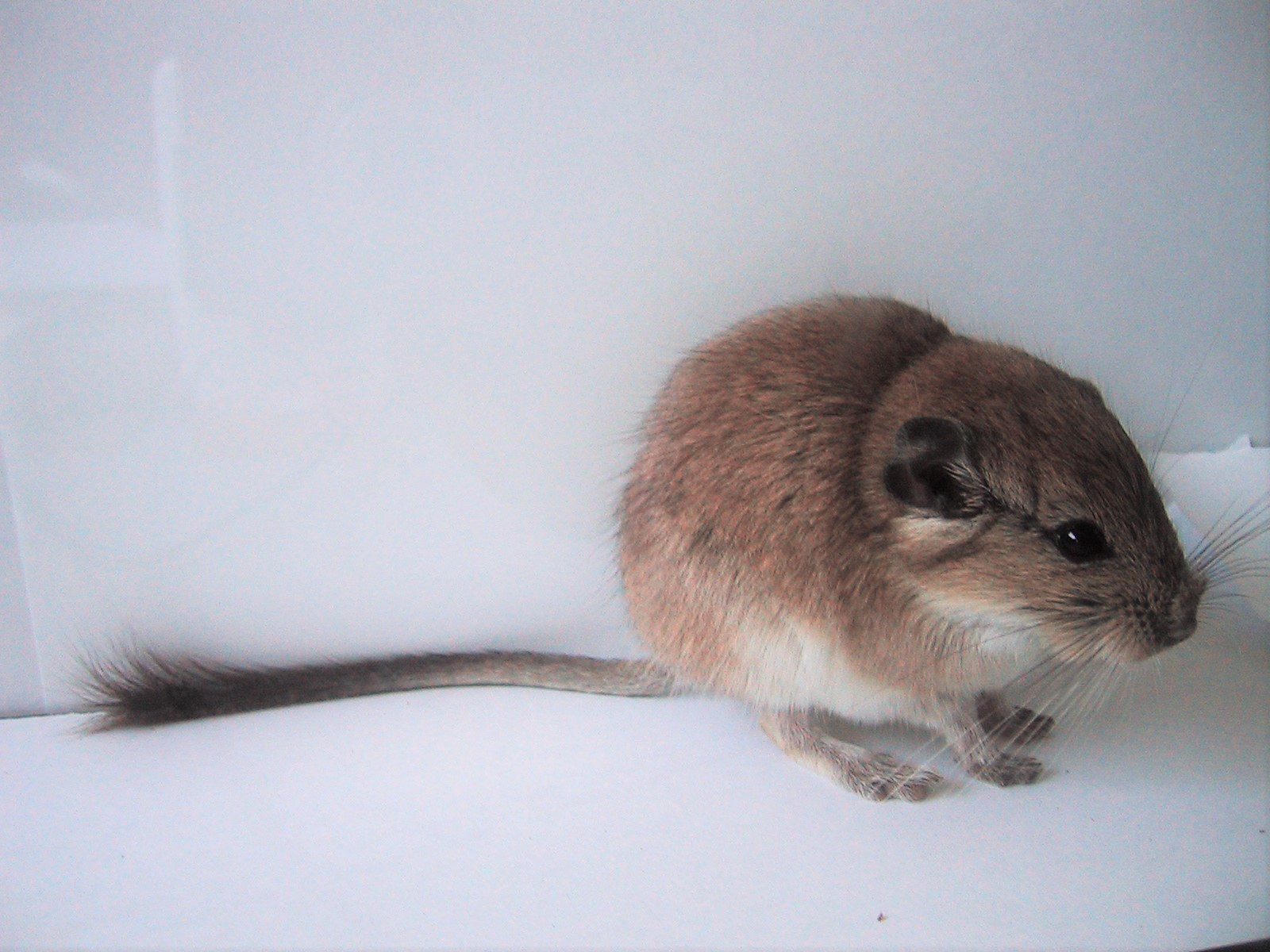
Plains viscacha rat

== Location ==
Rajaouna Mountain located in Tizi Ouzou, not far from Boumerdès, and surrounded by the Sebaou Valley.

This significant location within the Baloua Forest and Harouza Forest makes it a strategic location overlooking the city of Tizi Ouzou and facing the Djurdjura National Park.

Rajaouna Mountain is located a straight 17 kilometers south of the Mediterranean Sea and a straight 50 kilometers west of Lake Akfadou.

This mountain is located in the Tizi Ouzou Province in the Tizi Ouzou District.

== Photo gallery ==
Location of Rajaouna Mountain

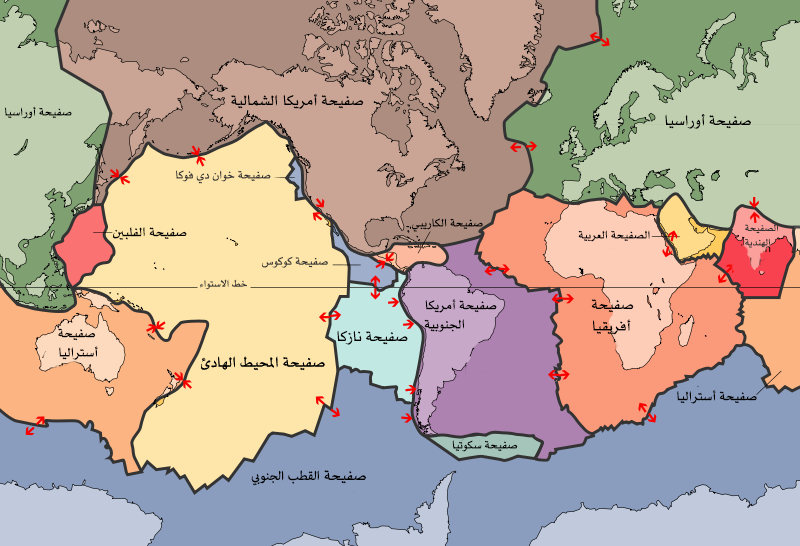
Plate tectonics

== See also ==
=== Related topics ===
- Tell Atlas
- Djurdjura
- Kabylia
- Tizi Ouzou
- Tizi Ouzou District
- Tizi Ouzou Provinc
