= Sidi Daoud =

Coordinates: 36°51′N 3°51′E

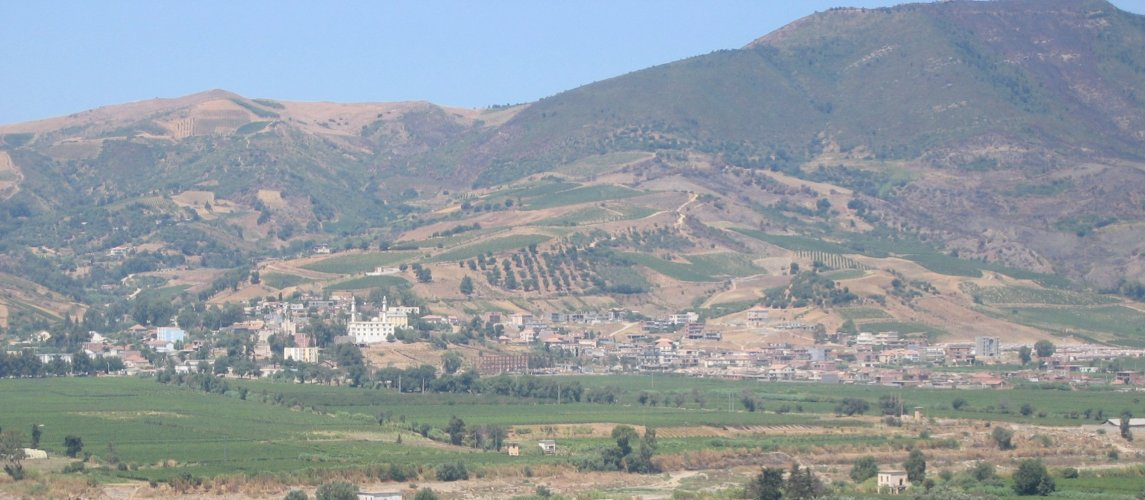
Sidi Daoud viewed from the east bank

Sidi Daoud (Arabic: سيدي داوود) is a farming town in north-central Algeria, on the west bank of the Sebaou River, a few kilometers downstream from its mouth. It is the capital of a municipality dominated by the mountain of Bouberak, including the coastal village of Sahel Bouberak and the zawiya of Sidi Amar Cherif. This municipality is one of three constituting the Baghlia District in eastern Boumerdès Province. As of 2008, the population of the municipality is 16,900.

== History ==
During the early colonial period, the area around Sidi Daoud was called Issers-Djedian, after the tribe inhabiting it. After defeating the 1871 Mokrani Revolt against colonial rule, the French government launched an extensive program of land expropriation to punish groups that had fought against them; from the Issers ed Djedian, they expropriated 2486 hectares of land in 1873 to found the new settlement of Bois-Sacré (Sacred Wood), thought to be a corruption of the Arabic place name Bou-Askri (place of the soldier). In 1909 it was renamed Abbo, after the French settler Adraste Abbo who had proposed the project of founding it. In 1958, it became part of the former department of Algiers. After Algeria's independence in 1962, the town took the name of Sidi Daoud.

== Zawiya ==
- Zawiyet Sidi Amar Cherif

== Notable people ==
- Hocine Ziani, Algerian artist.
- Gabriel Abbo, French politician
- Sidi Amar Cherif, Algerian theologian.
