= Tala Allam =

- Motto: ثالة علام
- Interactive map of Tala Allam
- Coordinates: 36.7251887°N 4.0319683°E
- Commune: Tizi Ouzou
- District: Tizi Ouzou District
- Province: Tizi Ouzou Province
- Region: Kabylie
- Country: Algeria

Area
  - Total: 5 km^{2} (1.9 sq mi)

Dimensions
  - Length: 2.5 km (1.6 mi)
  - Width: 2 km (1.2 mi)
- Elevation: 500 m (1,600 ft)
- Time zone: UTC+01:00
- Area code: 15000

Tala Allam is a village in the Tizi Ouzou Province in Kabylie, Algeria.

== Location ==
The village is surrounded by Sebaou River and the town of Tizi Ouzou in the Djurdjura mountain range.

== Notable people ==
- Mohamed Belhocine (born 1951), Algerian medical scientist, professor of internal medicine and epidemiology.

== Gallery ==
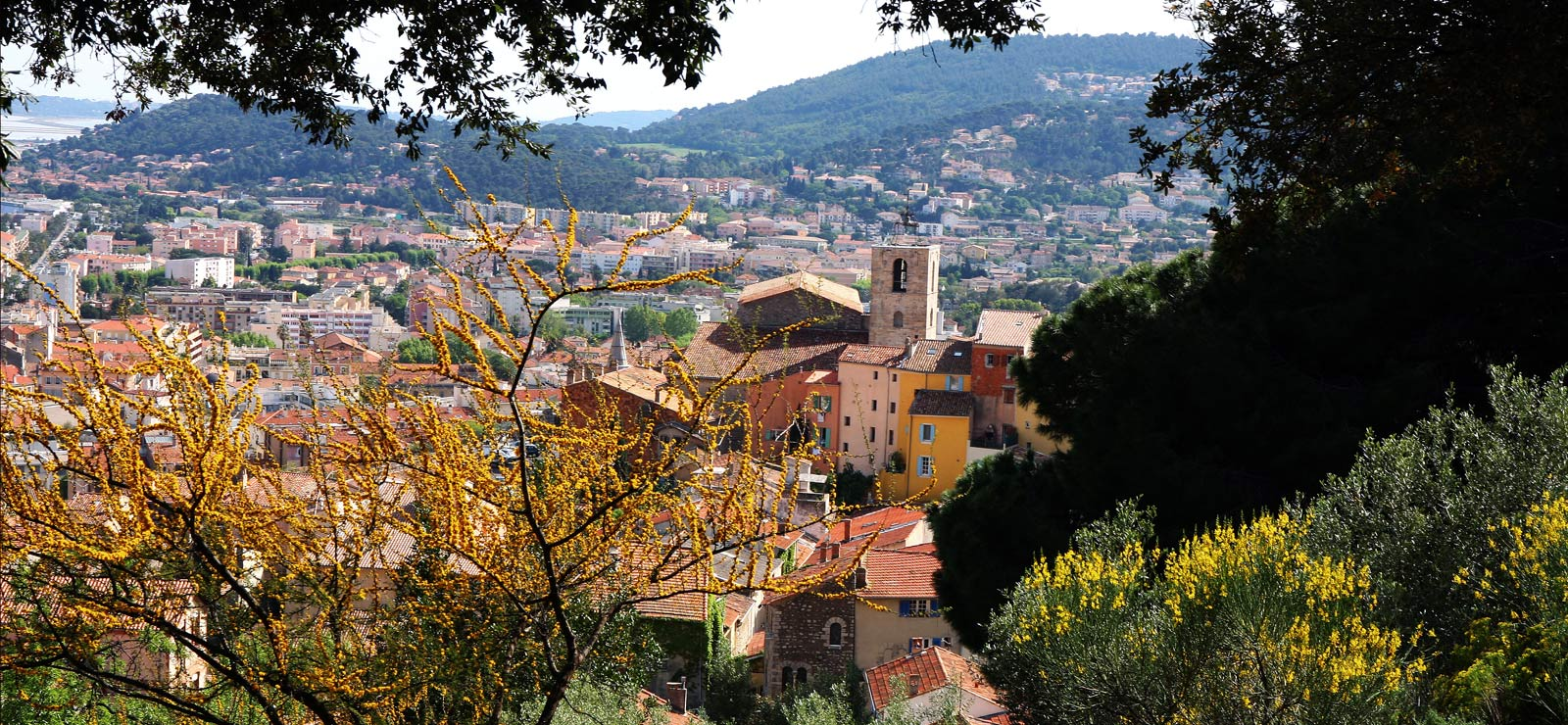
Tizi Ouzou
