= Paul Dubois =

Paul Dubois may refer to:

- Paul Dubois (sculptor) (1829–1905), French sculptor
- Paul Antoine Dubois (1795–1871), French obstetrician
- Paul Charles Dubois (1848–1918), Swiss neuropathologist
- Paul Dubois (diplomat) (born 1943), Canadian ambassador to Germany
- Paul Élie Dubois, French Orientalist painter
- Paul Du Bois (1859–1938), Belgian sculptor
