= Gabriel Abbo =

French politician

Gabriel Abbo (26 June 1883 – 20 October 1954) was a French politician, born in Sidi Daoud, Algeria (then named Abbo).

Abbo's grandfather had founded the village of Abboville, which was named after the family, and his father owned several important Algerian vineyards.

From 1921 to 1924, Abbo represented a French Algerian constituency (Anciens départements d'Algérie) at the Chamber of Deputies for the Republican-Socialist Party.
