= Henriette Dubois-Damart =

French painter

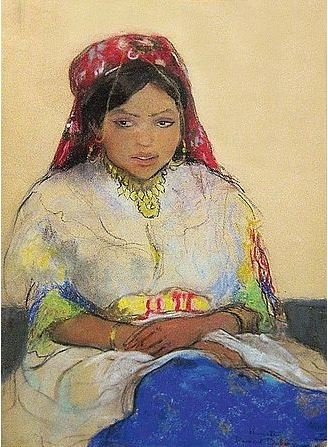
Portrait of Zo

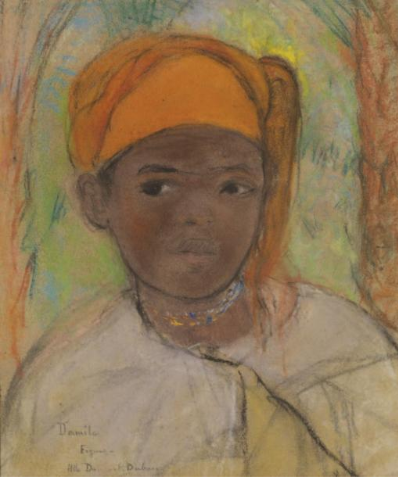
Portrait of Damila

Henriette Dubois-Damart, born Henriette Marguerite Blanche Damart (1885, Saint-Mard - 1945, Montbéliard) was a French painter and pastellist; known primarily for her Orientalist works from North Africa.

== Biography ==
She studied in Paris, at the Académie Julian, where her instructors were Tony Robert-Fleury, Odilon Redon and Adolphe Déchenaud. In terms of style, Redon would be her primary influence; inspiring her Impressionistic color palette.

In 1911, she exhibited at the Paris Salon. She also had showings at the Salon d'Automne, the Galerie Georges-Petit and the Salon in Tunis. In 1920, she was awarded the Prix Gallimard, followed by a gold medal at the Salon of 1924. Later, she was presented with the Order of Glory by the Tunisian monarchy.

In 1933, she married the Orientalist painter, Paul Élie Dubois, whom she had originally met at the Académie. After their marriage, she would accompany him throughout North Africa, where she painted landscapes and portraits of the local people; with a special affinity for young women and infants. She was awarded another gold medal by the Salon in 1935.

In addition to her paintings, she illustrated albums for children, such as Toinette et la guerre (Toinette and the War, 1917), by Lucie Paul-Margueritte, and Josette et Jehan de Reims (1910), by Louise-Andrée Roze; both published by Berger-Levrault.

Her works may be seen at museums in Tarbes and Washington.
