= Schwarzach, Baden-Württemberg =

Schwarzach
- Municipality
- Coat of arms

- Location of Schwarzach within Neckar-Odenwald-Kreis district
- Interactive map of Schwarzach
- Location within Germany Location within Baden-Württemberg
- Coordinates: 49°22′23″N 8°58′59″E
- Country: Germany
- State: Baden-Württemberg
- Admin. region: Karlsruhe
- District: Neckar-Odenwald-Kreis
- Subdivisions: 2

Government
  - Mayor (2022–30): Mathias Haas

Area
  - Total: 8.36 km^{2} (3.23 sq mi)
- Elevation: 219 m (719 ft)

Population (2025-12-31)
  - Total: 2,883
  - Density: 345/km^{2} (893/sq mi)
- Time zone: UTC+01:00 (CET)
  - Summer (DST): UTC+02:00 (CEST)
- Postal codes: 74869
- Dialling codes: 06262
- Vehicle registration: MOS, BCH
- Website: www.schwarzach-online.de

Schwarzach (German pronunciation: [ˈʃvaʁtsax]) is a municipality in the district of Neckar-Odenwald-Kreis, in Baden-Württemberg, Germany. Schwarzach consists of the two former districts Oberschwarzach and Unterschwarzach.

== Mayors ==
- Since 2015: Mathias Haas
- 1991-2014: Theo Haaf

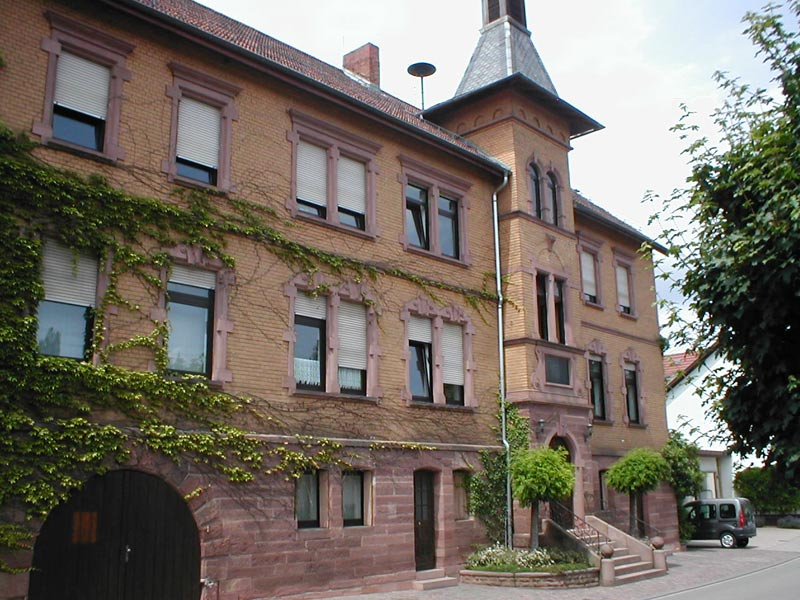
Unterschwarzach Town hall
