= Paul Élie Dubois =

French painter (1886–1949)

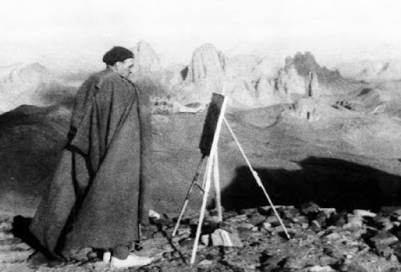
Dubois, painting at Assekrem

Paul Élie Dubois (French pronunciation: [pɔl eli dybwa]; 20 October 1886, in Colombier-Châtelot – 14 February 1949, in Montbéliard) was a French Orientalist painter; identified with the "École d'Alger".

== Biography ==
His father, Élie Dubois, was a dentist in Montbéliard and belonged to a religious community known as the Plymouth Brethren.

He studied at the Académie Julian, followed by Jean-Paul Laurens and Fernand Cormon at the École Nationale Supérieure des Beaux-Arts, and had his first exhibition at the Salon in 1910. He styled himself as an ethnographic painter and took part in many missions to North Africa; notably to the area around the Hoggar Mountains. He presented the works he created there at the Paris Colonial Exposition of 1931, the Brussels International Exposition (1935), the Exposition Universelle (1937) and the 1939 New York World's Fair.

In 1933, he married Henriette Damart, a pastellist who had worked in Tunisia, and would work with him throughout North Africa.

He was the recipient of numerous awards; including the Abd-el-Tif Prize (1920) and the Grand prix Arts artistique de l'Algérie (1927), His works may be seen at the National Museum of Fine Arts of Algiers, the Bardo National Museum (Tunis), the Musée des Années Trente de Boulogne-Billancourt, and several others throughout France.

In 2019, on the occasion of the 70th anniversary of his death, the city of Luxeuil-les-Bains paid him tribute. To this end, the Musée de la Tour des Échevins presented a dual exhibition, featuring Dubois and the contemporary Algerian artist, Hocine Ziani, who has also created paintings at Hoggar.

== Selected paintings ==
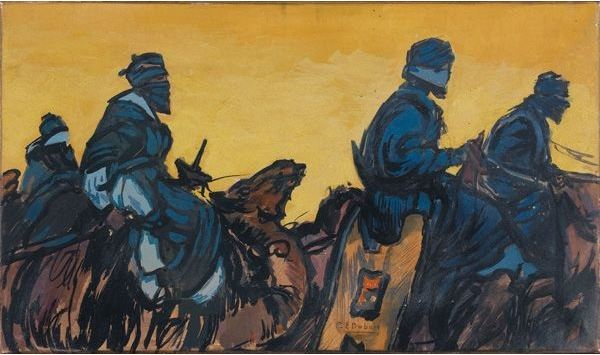
The Meharists

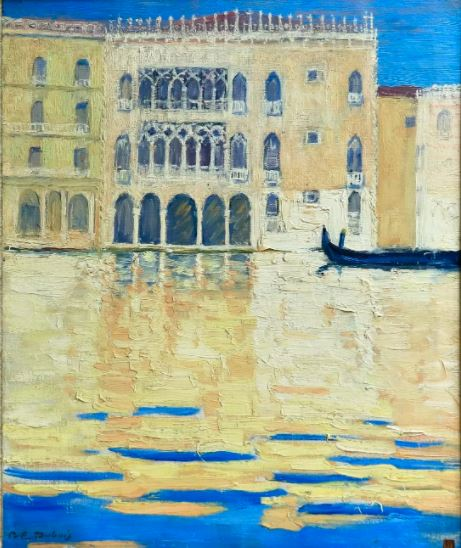
Venice Canal at Dusk

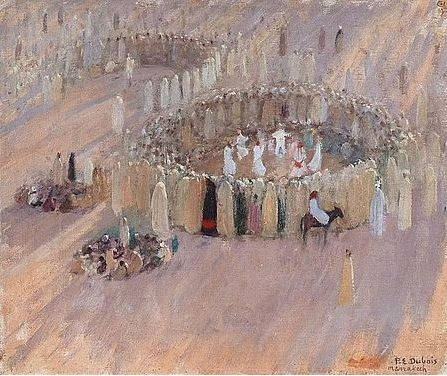
Shilha Dancers

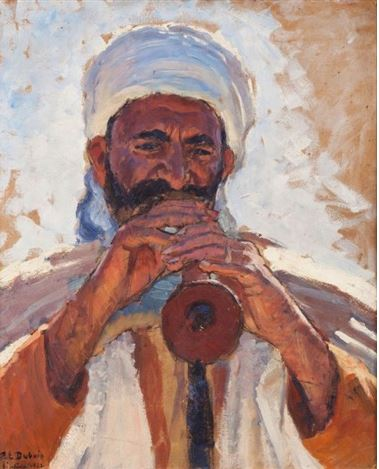
Flute Player

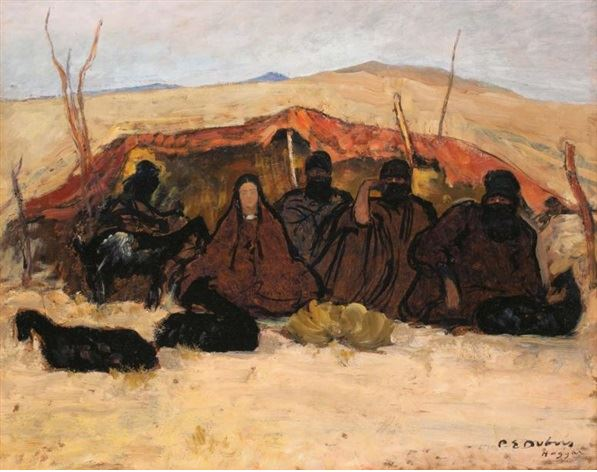
Encampment at Hoggar
