= Oued Sebt =

River in Algeria

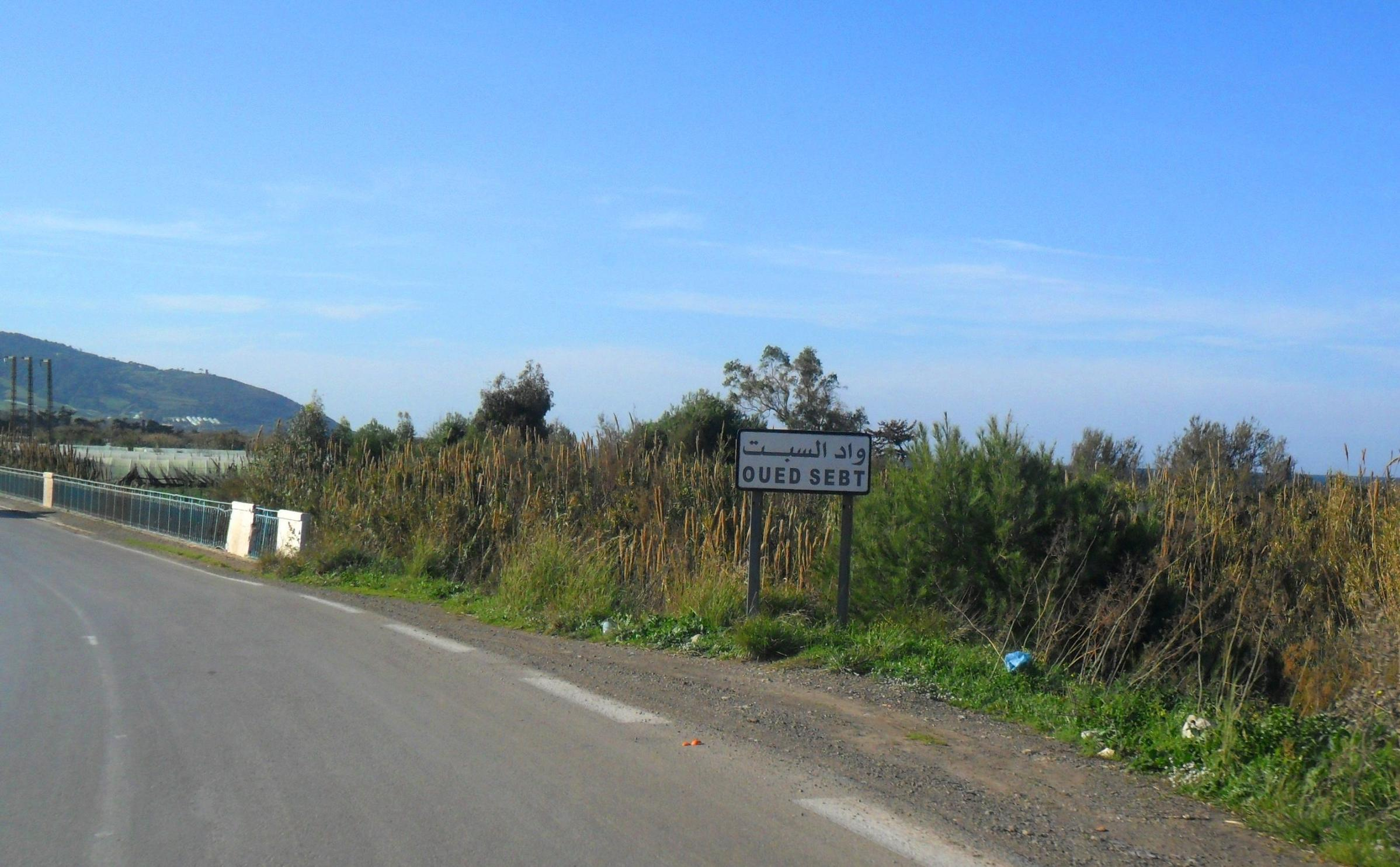
Oued Sebt panoramio.

The Oued Sebt ( واد السبت) is a small river in Algeria between the city of Gouraya, Tipaza and meselmoun. The post code for the area is 19542.
