= Sebaou River =

River in Algeria

Coordinates: 36°54′N 3°54′E

Sebaou River Oued Sebaou, Asif n Sabaw
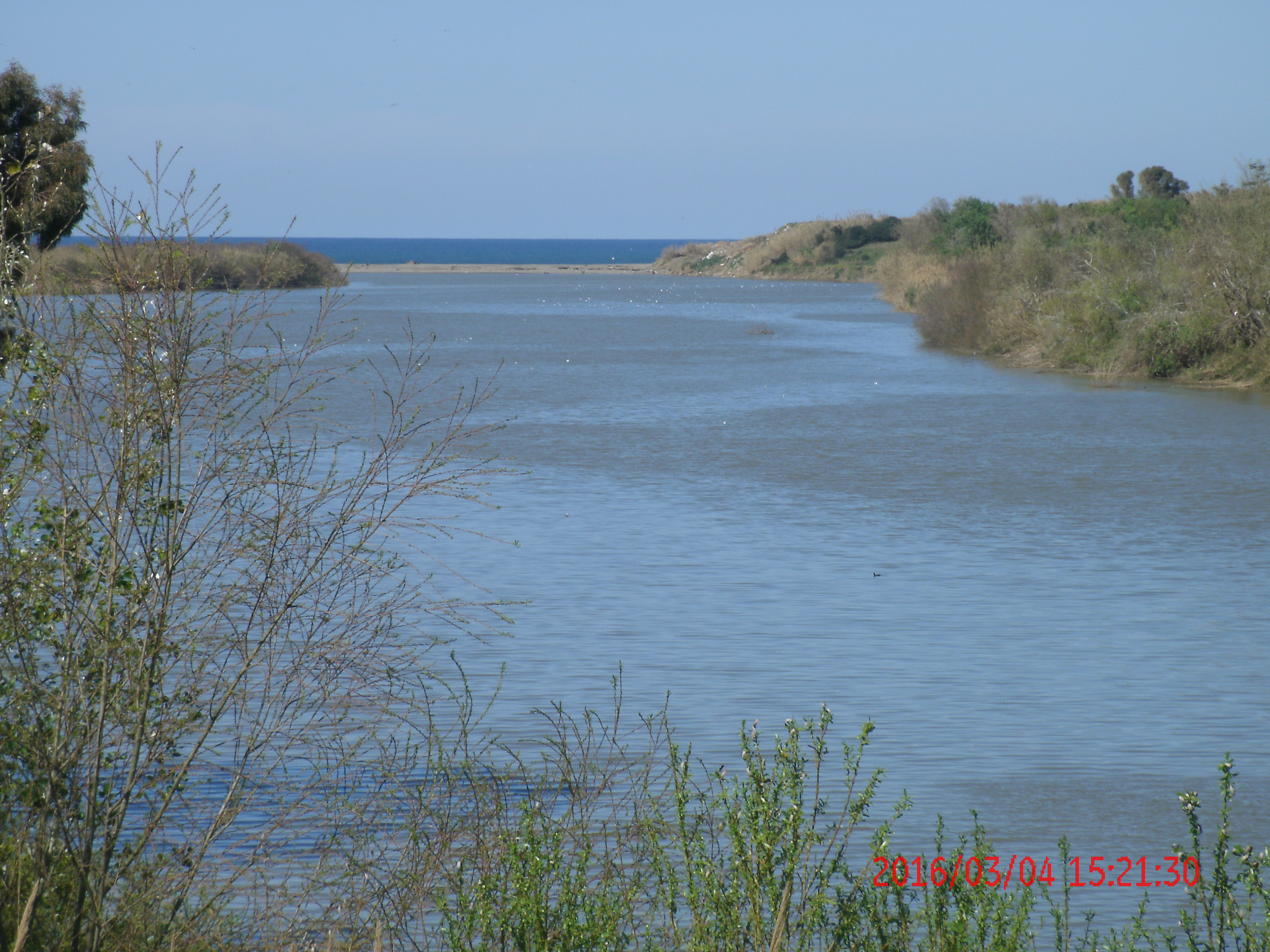
- Mouth of the Sebaou River

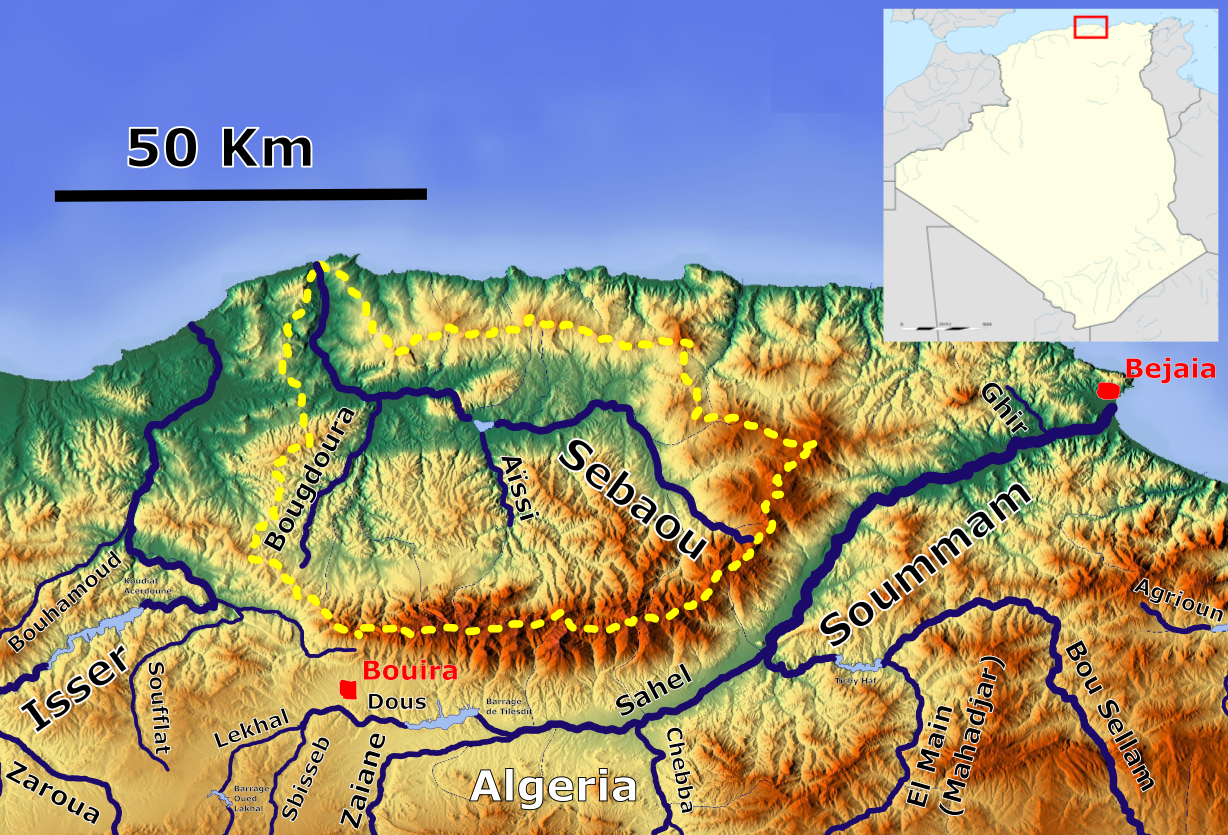
- The Sebaou river basin

Location
- Countries: Algeria

Physical characteristics
- Mouth: Mediterranean Sea

Basin features
- Tributaries
  - left: Bougdoura, Aïssi

The Sebaou River, or Oued Sebaou (Asif n Sabaw in Kabyle, Wād Sībāw or Wād Nissa in Arabic) is the main river of the western Kabylie region of Algeria (roughly corresponding to the present-day Tizi Ouzou Province), which flows into the Mediterranean near the coastal town of Dellys in Boumerdès Province.

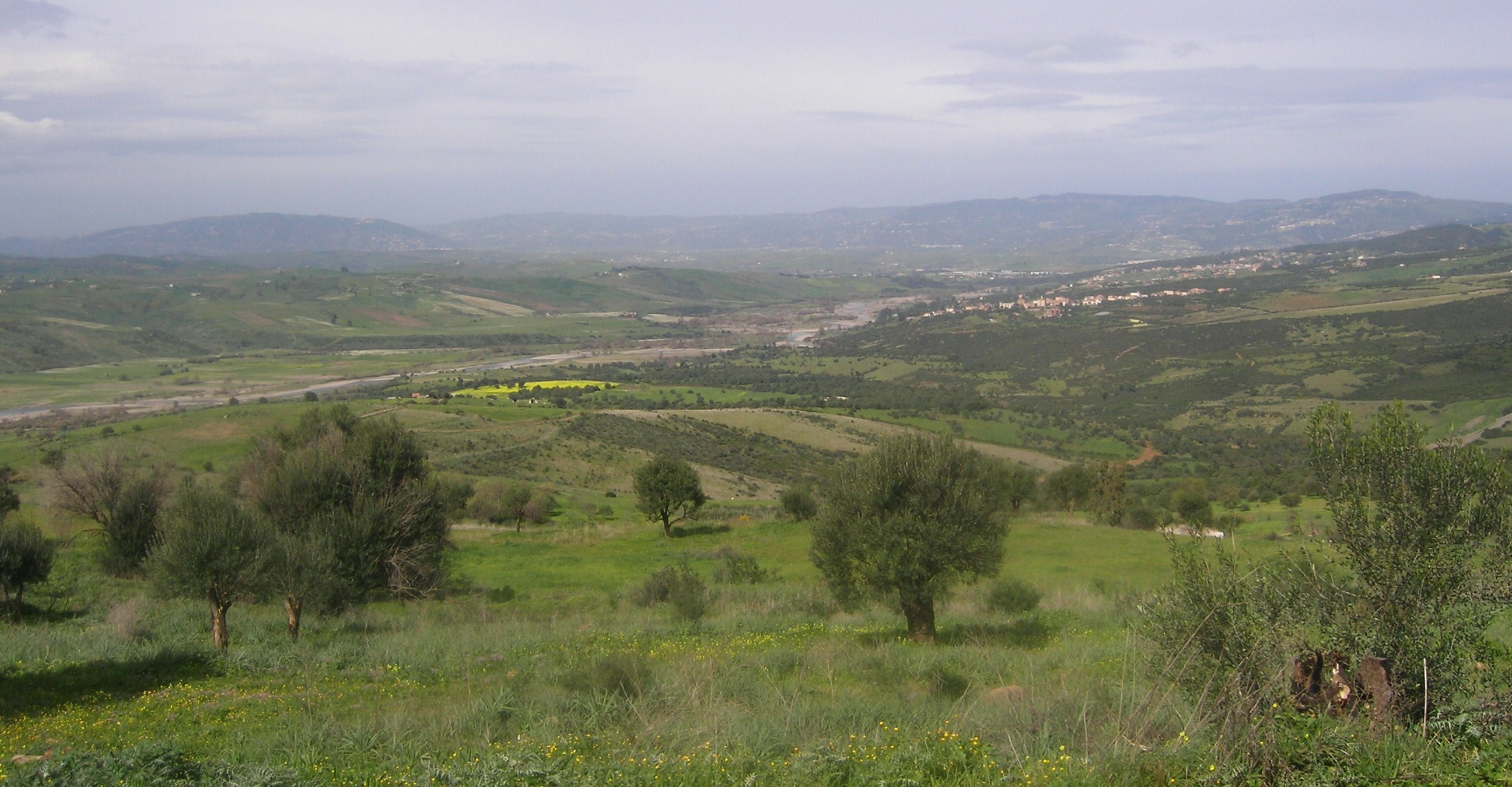
Valley of the upper Sebaou

Sebaou is also the name given to the valley crossed by this river that goes from Boubhir to Dellys. Its name is shared by the village and former Ottoman fort of Bordj Sebaou, on its banks.
