= Convoy UGS-40 =

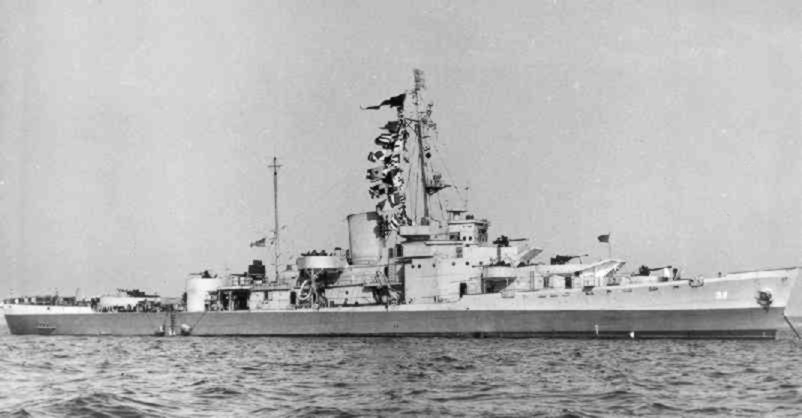
USCGC Campbell (WPG-32), the lead warship of the escort task force for Convoy UGS-40.

Convoy UGS-40 was an Allied merchant navy convoy with a military escort which sailed from Norfolk, Virginia on 22 April 1944, and passed through the Gibraltar Strait on 9 May 1944 on its way to Naples. The convoy was shadowed for two days by German aircraft. Allied Beaufighters were sent out ten times to attack the reconnaissance aircraft without success. After this, on 11 May, the convoy came under heavy air attack 50 miles east of Algiers. At least 19 German aircraft were shot down by the convoy while the Germans failed to hit a single Allied ship.

== Bombers attack ==
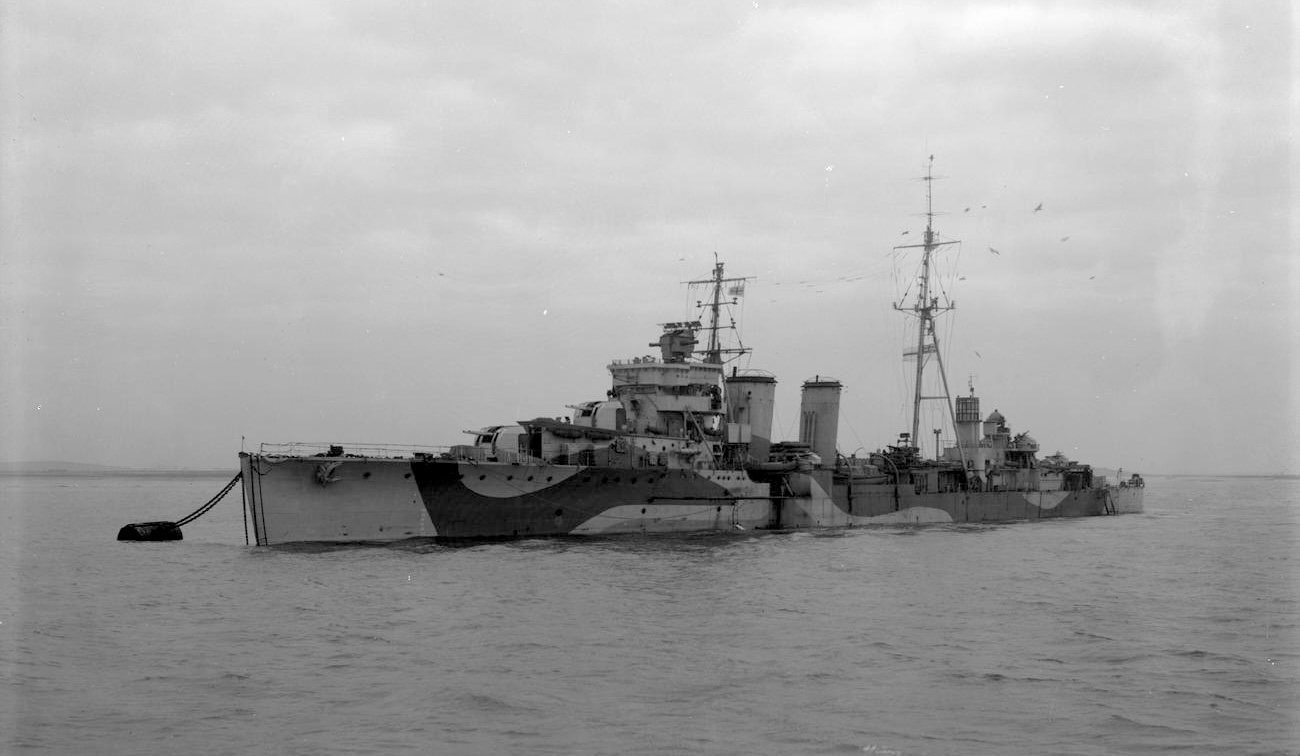
The anti-aircraft cruiser, HMS Caledon, which tracked the incoming raids with her powerful radar.

The convoy was shadowed by German reconnaissance aircraft from 9 May, after passing the Gibraltar Strait. The German aircraft avoided at least ten attempts by the Allies to intercept. This was enough to put the convoy on alert, expecting a major attack. Their fears were well founded.

At 19:50 hours, 11 May, the convoy was travelling in eight columns, spaced 1,000 yards (910 m) apart and 500 yards (460 m) between ships in each column. Air support was 3,000 yards (2,700 m) out from the convoy, anticipating an attack in light of the persistent reconnaissance, when the convoy came under attack. Radar warnings were received at 20:25 hours and again by 20:45, as twilight set in. Smoke pots were lit which greatly reduced target visibility for the bomber crews.

German torpedo planes formed up 10–20 miles (16–32 km) north of the convoy where they were receiving blinkered signals from Arab spies on Cape Tedles. The advance of the attacking planes was clearly monitored by HMS Caledon from the edge of the smoke screen. Shortly after 09:00 hours the convoy started to fire a barrage into the sky. Junkers, Heinkels and Dorniers began a "pile driving" attack in four waves, a few minutes apart from each other, of around seven planes per wave.

UGS-40 turned 45 degrees into the attack where the escort and armed guard on the merchant ships, holding fire until the moment of visual confirmation, joined the attack. Around five minutes after the initial barrage had been ordered the battle was in full swing. Five inch, three inch and 20 mm guns were fired from the merchant ships, at the bombers and torpedo bombers as they passed along the convoy in a glide, some as low as 40 feet (12 m) from sea level, attempting to find targets within the thick haze of smoke screen. The bombers appeared to be in a confusion trying to find the ships, some exploding in bright flashes under the Allied fire. Dorniers dropped their bombs but did not hit any of the ships, and radio controlled glide bombs were sighted and avoided.

The merchant ships held a steady course while the military escorts manoeuvred at around 20 knots. The convoy turned another 45 degrees back to their original easterly course at 21:22 hours, and by 21:45 hours, the attack was completely over. Algiers signalled the all clear just after 10:00 hours, and many ships remained on high alert through the night, but no more attacks came. One ship in the convoy, Chips, suffered friendly fire damage from a few stray 20 mm shots, injuring four military personnel, but otherwise no Allied ships were damaged. Reports collated at least 19 German planes destroyed. Two Allied Beaufighters were lost. The admiral, Royal R. Ingersoll II, signalled an "outstanding" performance. Convoy USG-42 was attacked around the same area in a mid-night attack a few weeks later, on 31 May.

== Ships in convoy ==
USG-40 convoy consisted of 65 merchant ships, 8 escort destroyers, 4 destroyers, 2 minesweepers, 1 anti aircraft cruiser, 1 coast guard cutter, and 1 tug. The individual vessels were as follows:

=== Escorts (Task Force TF.61) ===
- USCGC Campbell (WPG-32) (Cmdr. Sowell USCG)
- USS Dallas (DD-199)
- USS Bernadou (DD-153)
- USS Ellis (DD-154)
- USS Benson (DD-421)
- USS Dobler (DE-48)
- USS Decker (DE-47)
- USS Smartt (DE-257)
- USS Evarts (DE-5)
- USS Wyffels (DE-6)
- USS Walter S. Brown (DE-258)
- USS Wilhoite (DE-397)
- HMS Caledon (D53)
- French frigate Tunisien
- French sloop Le Cimeterre
- USS Sustain (AM-119)
- USS Steady (AM-118)
- HMS Hengist (W 110) (rescue tug)

=== Merchant ships ===
- Magdala (Dutch)
- Fort Michipicoten (Canadian)
- Fernbrook (Norwegian) (built in Copenhagen in 1932)
- Laurentide Park (Norwegian)
- Salimis (Norwegian)
- Abangarez (US)
- Abraham Lincoln (US)
- Albino Perez (US)
- Ben F. Dixon (US)
- Benjamin Huntington (US)
- Carter Braxton (US)
- Clement Clay (US)
- Colin P. Kelly Jr (US)
- Conrad Weiser (US)
- Cornelius Gilliam (US)
- Francis M. Smith (US)
- George H. Dern (US)
- Grenville M. Dodge (US)
- James J. Pettigrew (US)
- James W. Fannin (US)
- James Whitcomb Riley (US)
- Janet L. Roper (US)
- John Banvard (US)
- John Dickinson (US)
- John F. Myers (US)
- John Stevens (US)
- John W. Griffiths (US)
- Odysseus (US)
- Peter Zenger (US)
- Stephen A. Douglas (US)
- Samuel Moody (US)
- Thomas L. Clingman (US)
- Thomas Nuttall (US)
- Thomas W. Bickett (US)
- Van Lear Black (US)
- William B. Giles (US)
- William H. Aspinwall (US)
- William H. Moody (US)
- William Mulholland (US)
- William Paterson (US)
- Zachary Taylor (US)
- Ben H. Miller (UK)
- Empire Alliance (UK)
- Empire Stalwart (UK)
- Junecrest (UK)
- Neocardia (UK)
- Port Melbourne (UK)
- Sambarie (UK)
- Samdaring (UK)
- Samfairy (UK)
- Samgallion (UK)
- Samkansa (UK)
- Samlea (UK)
- Sampenn (UK)
- Samspelgy (UK)

== See also ==
- UG convoys
