= SS Ben H. Miller =

World War II Liberty ship of the United States

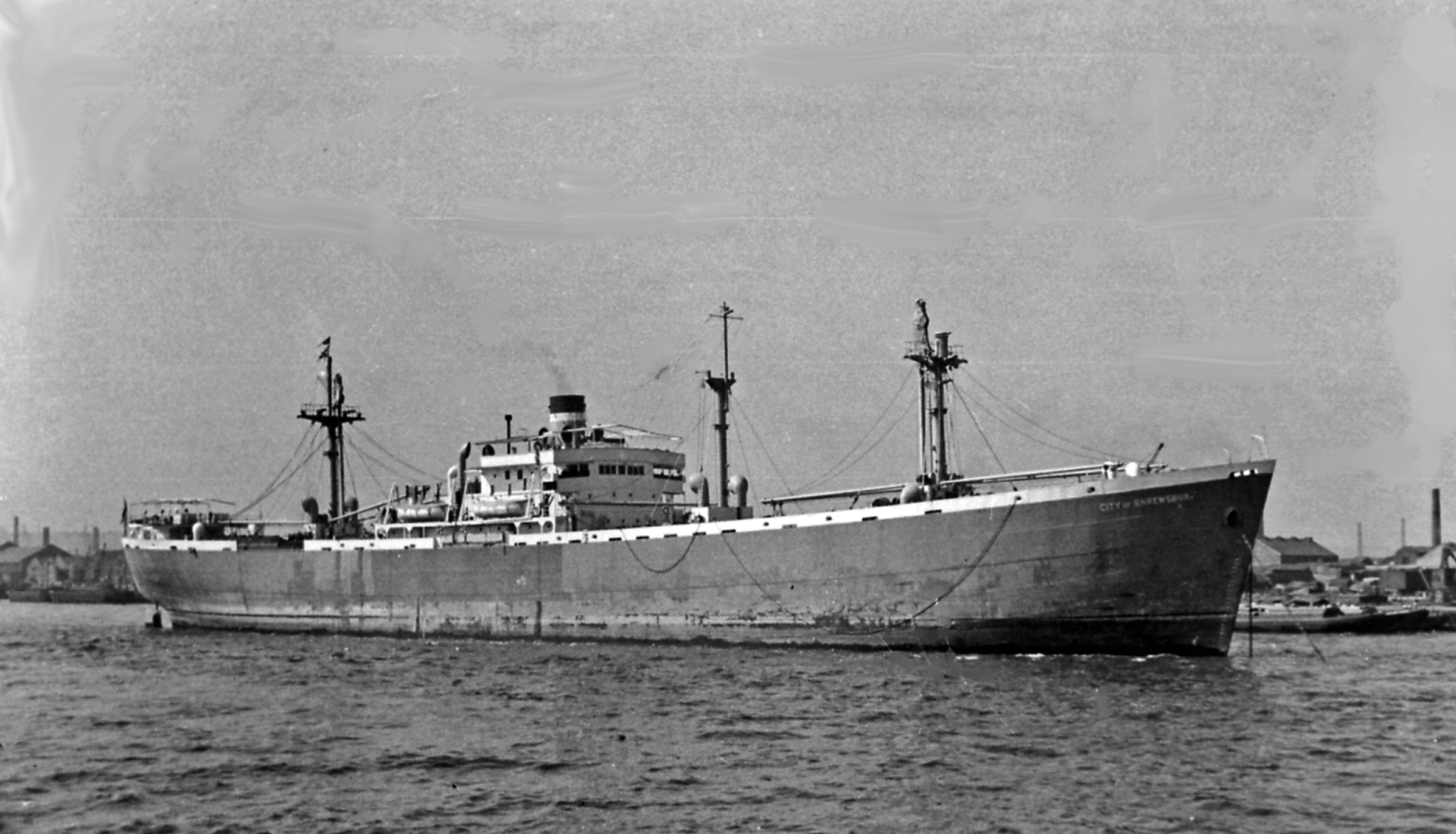
- City of Shrewsbury on 10 June 1950

History
- Name: Ben H. Miller (1943–1947); City of Shrewsbury (1947–59); Marucla (1959–1969)
- Namesake: Ben H. Miller; Shrewsbury
- Port of registry: London, United Kingdom (1944–59); Beirut, Lebanon (1959–69)
- Builder: Bethlehem Fairfield Shipyard
- Yard number: 2292
- Way number: 9
- Laid down: 20 November 1943
- Launched: 10 December 1943
- Completed: 20 December 1943
- In service: 6 January 1944
- Out of service: 1969
- Identification: Code Letters MYPR (1944–59); United Kingdom Official Number 169763 (1943–59)
- Fate: Scrapped, May 1969

General characteristics
- Class & type: Liberty ship; type EC2-S-C1, standard
- Tonnage: 10,865 LT DWT; 7,176 GRT
- Displacement: 3,380 long tons (3,434 t) (light); 14,245 long tons (14,474 t) (max)
- Length: 441 feet 6 inches (135 m) oa; 416 feet (127 m) pp; 427 feet (130 m) lwl
- Beam: 57 feet (17 m)
- Draft: 27 ft 9.25 in (8.4646 m)
- Installed power: 2 × Oil fired 450 °F (232 °C) boilers, operating at 220 psi (1,500 kPa); 2,500 hp (1,900 kW)
- Propulsion: 1 × triple-expansion steam engine, (manufactured by General Machinery Corp., Hamilton, Ohio); 1 × screw propeller
- Speed: 11.5 knots (21.3 km/h; 13.2 mph)
- Capacity: 562,608 cubic feet (15,931 m^{3}) (grain); 499,573 cubic feet (14,146 m^{3}) (bale)
- Complement: 38–62 USMM; 21–40 USNAG
- Armament: Varied by ship; Bow-mounted 3-inch (76 mm)/50-caliber gun; Stern-mounted 4-inch (102 mm)/50-caliber gun; 2–8 × single 20-millimeter (0.79 in) Oerlikon anti-aircraft (AA) cannons and/or, 2–8 × 37-millimeter (1.46 in) M1 AA guns

SS Ben H. Miller was a British merchant ship of World War II. A Liberty ship built in the United States in 1943, she was bareboat chartered to the British Ministry of War Transport, with Ellerman and Papayanni as managers. Sold to her managers after the war, she was renamed SS City of Shrewsbury in 1947. Resold in 1959, she became the Compagnia de Navigazione Arcoul's SS Marucla, and was scrapped in 1969. Her original namesake was Ben H. Miller.

== Construction ==
The keel of the ship was laid on 20 November 1943, as Yard No.2292 on Way No.9, at the Bethlehem Fairfield Shipyard, in Baltimore, under US Maritime Commission contract 1844. She was launched 20 days later under the name Ben H. Miller. Her namesake, Ben H. Miller, was Washington correspondent for the Baltimore newspaper The Evening Sun before his death in the crash of an aircraft in 1942.

== Description ==
The ship was 442 ft 8 in (134.92 m) long overall (417 ft 9 in (127.33 m) between perpendiculars, 427 ft 0 in (130.15 m) waterline), with a beam of 57 ft 0 in (17.37 m). She had a depth of 34 ft 8 in (10.57 m) and a draught of 27 ft 9 in (8.46 m). She was assessed at 7,210 GRT, 4,880 NRT, 10,856 DWT.

She was powered by a triple expansion steam engine, which had cylinders of 24.5 inches (62 cm), 37 inches (94 cm) and 70 inches (180 cm) diameter by 70 inches (180 cm) stroke. The engine was built by the Worthington Pump & Machinery Corporation, Harrison, New Jersey. It drove a single screw propeller, which could propel the ship at 11 knots (20 km/h).

== Service history ==
The ship was completed on 20 December 1943, and was delivered to the War Shipping Administration, Los Angeles. She was immediately placed on bareboat charter to the British Ministry of War Transport, with Ellerman and Papayanni as managers. It was initially planned that her name would be changed before entering service with the British, taking a name beginning with the prefix "Sam", as was common practice. However, Miller's family objected, and the name was retained in British service. Her port of registry was London. The Code Letters MYPR and United Kingdom Official Number 169763 were allocated.

Ben H. Miller departed from Baltimore, on 9 January 1944, for New York City, where she arrived the next day. She sailed on 31 January, for the Hampton Roads, Virginia, to join Convoy UGS 32, which departed on 3 February, and arrived at Port Said, Egypt, on 1 March. She left the convoy at Algiers, Algeria, where she arrived on 21 February. She sailed on 5 March, to join Convoy GUS 32 which she left on 9 March, at Casablanca, Morocco. She sailed on 17 March, to join Convoy GUS 33, which had departed from Port Said, on 5 March, and arrived at the Hampton Roads, on 4 April. She sailed on to New York.

Ben H. Miller departed from New York, on 21 August, for the Hampton Roads. She joined Convoy UGS 40, which departed on 23 April, and arrived at Port Said, on 19 May. She left the convoy at Augusta, Sicily, Italy, on 15 May. She made a return trip to Naples, Italy, via Convoys VN 40 and NV 43, before sailing on 8 June, to join Convoy GUS 42, which had departed from Port Said, on 3 June, and arrived at the Hampton Roads, on 29 June. She sailed on to Baltimore. She departed from Baltimore, on 4 July, arriving at New York, the next day.

Ben H. Miller departed from New York, on 25 July, as a member of Convoy HX 301, which arrived at Liverpool, Lancashire, on 8 August. She was recorded as being fitted with anti-torpedo nets. She left the convoy at Loch Ewe, sailing on to Southend, Essex, via convoys WN 618A and FS 1541, arriving on 13 August. Ben H. Miller departed from Southend, on 1 September, for Loch Ewe, via Convoys FN 1467 and EN 431. She then joined Convoy ON 252, which departed from Liverpool, on 7 September, and arrived at New York, on 22 September.

Ben H. Miller was a member of Convoy UGS 57, which departed from New York, on 12 October, and arrived at Port Said, on 9 November. She left the convoy at Augusta, on 4 November, and joining Convoy AH 77, which sailed that day and arrived at Bari, Italy, two days later. She left the convoy at Taranto, on 5 November, sailing four days later for Bari, where she arrived on 11 November. Ben H. Miller departed from Bari, on 20 November, for Gibraltar, arriving five days later. She sailed for Casablanca, on 27 November, arriving the next day. She sailed on 14 December, to join Convoy GUS 61, which had departed from Oran, Algeria, on 12 December, and arrived at the Hampton Roads, on 29 December. She sailed on to New York.

Ben H. Miller departed from New York, on 22 January 1945, to join Convoy UGS 70, which departed from the Hampton Roads, the next day and arrived at Gibraltar, on 7 February. She left the convoy at Faial Island, Azores, on 3 February. UGS 70 was her last convoy of World War II. She departed from Faial Island, on 16 February, arriving at Port Said, on 3 March. She then sailed to Suez, Egypt, and Aden, from where she departed on 10 March for Colombo, Ceylon, arriving on 18 March, and sailing that day for Madras, India. She arrived on 21 March, and sailed ten days later for Calcutta, arriving on 4 April. Ben H. Miller departed from Calcutta, on 14 April, for Colombo, arriving a week later. She sailed on 1 May, for Durban, South Africa, where she arrived on 16 May, sailing two days later for Buenos Aires, Argentina, arriving on 5 June.

== Post-war career ==
Post-war, was Ben H. Miller retained by the Ministry, including after its renaming to the Ministry of Transport in 1946. She sailed on 11 June 1945, for Bahía Blanca, Brazil, arriving a week later and sailing on 20 June, for Pernambuco, where she arrived on 30 June. She sailed on 1 July, for Liverpool, arriving on 17 July. Ben H. Miller departed from Liverpool, on 13 November, for Alexandria, Egypt, arriving on 26 November. She sailed on 11 December, for Haifa, Israel, where she arrived the next day.

In 1947 Ben H. Miller was sold to her managers, who transferred her to their subsidiary Ellerman & Bucknall SS Co., and renamed her City of Shrewsbury. They operated her until her sale to Compagnia de Navigazione Arcoul, Lebanon in 1959. Her new owners renamed her Marucla.

On 27 October 1962, during the Cuban Missile Crisis, Marucla was the only merchant ship to be intercepted by the Americans as she sailed to Cuba. She had been chartered by the Soviets and was carrying a cargo from Riga to Havana, when she was intercepted by USS John R. Pierce and USS Joseph P. Kennedy Jr. 180 nautical miles (330 km) north east of Nassau, Bahamas. Her crew cooperated with the Americans and no prohibited material was found on board. She was allowed to proceed.

She was scrapped in Hong Kong, in May 1969, by Mollers' Ltd.
