= MV British Dragoon =

History
- Name: Empire Alliance (1943-45); British Dragoon (1945-62)
- Owner: Ministry of War Transport (1943-45); British Tanker Co. Ltd. (1945-62)
- Operator: Anglo-Saxon Petroleum Co. Ltd. (1943); British Tanker Co. Ltd. (1943-62)
- Port of registry: (United Kingdom) Sunderland
- Builder: Sir James Laing & Sons Ltd, Sunderland
- Yard number: 747
- Launched: 8 March 1943
- Completed: June 1943
- Out of service: 12 December 1962
- Identification: UK Official Number 169117; Code letters BFJD
- Fate: Scrapped in Blyth December 1962

General characteristics
- Tonnage: 9,909 GRT
- Length: 482 ft 7 in (147.09 m)
- Beam: 68 ft 3 in (20.80 m)
- Depth: 36 ft 1 in (11.00 m)
- Propulsion: 2 x 6-cylinder 4SCDA oil engines (Harland & Wolff Ltd, Glasgow) 490 hp (370 kW)

British Dragoon was a 9,909 ton tanker which was built as Empire Alliance in 1943. She was renamed British Dragoon in 1945, and scrapped in 1962.

== History ==
Empire Alliance was built by Sir James Laing & Sons Ltd, Sunderland as yard number 747. She was launched on 8 March 1943 and completed in June 1943. Empire Alliance was built for the Ministry of War Transport and operated under the management of the Anglo-Saxon Petroleum Co, London and later the British Tanker Company.

=== War service ===
Empire Alliance was a member of a number of convoys during the Second World War.

HX 251

Convoy HX 251 departed New York City on 7 August 1943 and arrived at Liverpool on 23 August. Empire Alliance was carrying a cargo of gas, bound for Avonmouth.

UGS 34

Convoy UGS 34 which departed Hampton Roads on 23 February 1944 bound for Port Said. Empire Alliance transferred to another convoy at sea on 13 March.

GUS 33

Empire Alliance joined Convoy GUS 33 at sea from Convoy UGS 34 on 13 March 1944. The convoy had departed Port Said on 5 March 1944 bound for Hampton Roads. On 14 March she left the convoy bound for Algiers.

UGS 40

Convoy UGS 40 departed Norfolk, Virginia on 22 April 1944. On 11 May the convoy was bound for Bizerta, Tunisia when it came under air attack. Seventeen enemy aircraft were shot down without any of the ships in the convoy being lost.

=== Postwar ===
In 1945, Empire Alliance was sold to the British Tanker Company who renamed her British Dragoon. On 18 January 1951, British Dragoon was in collision with the Spanish ship Santi, which sank. The collision occurred off Cape Espichel, Portugal. Thirty-six survivors were rescued by British Dragoon, which suffered some damage but managed to reach Lisbon safely. She served until 1962, arriving at Blyth for scrapping on 12 December 1962.

== Official number and code letters ==
Official Numbers were a forerunner to IMO Numbers.

Empire Alliance had the UK Official Number 169117 and used the Code Letters BFJD.

== See also ==
- Convoy UGS-40
