= Rusippisir =

Phoenician, Carthaginian, and Roman town

- Location within Algeria
- 36°54′03.4″N 4°09′34.5″E
- Location: Taksebt, Tizi Ouzou Province, Algeria

Rusippisir was a Phoenician, Carthaginian, and Roman town on Algeria's Mediterranean coast at the site of present-day Taksebt.

== Name ==
Rusippisir is the latinization of the town's Punic name, which probably meant "Cape Rosemary".

== Geography ==
Rusippisir was located at Cape Tedless (French: Cap Tedles), Algeria, the site of present-day Taksebt in Tizi Ouzou.

== History ==
Rusippisir was established as a colony on the trade route between Phoenicia and the Strait of Gibraltar. Its port was nearby Iomnium (present-day Tigzirt). It later fell under Carthaginian and then, after the Punic Wars, Roman hegemony. Punic steles in Rusippisir continued to be produced well into the imperial period and there was tophet in the town.

== Religion ==
In antiquity, Rusippisir was the site of a Christian bishopric. This was revived in the 20th century as a Catholic titular see (Latin: Dioecesis Rusubisiritana; Italian: Rusibisir).

=== List of bishops ===
- Léon-Théobald Delaere, OFM Cap (1967.08.03 – 1976.09.14)
- Theodore Edgar McCarrick (1977.05.24 – 1981.11.19)
- Ivan Dias (1982.05.08 – 1996.11.08)
- Daniel Caro Borda (2000.07.21 – 2003.08.06)
- Martin David Holley (2004.05.18 – 2016.10.19)
- Mark E. Brennan (2017.01.19 - present)
