= Iomnium =

Ancient port in modern-day Tigzirt, Algeria

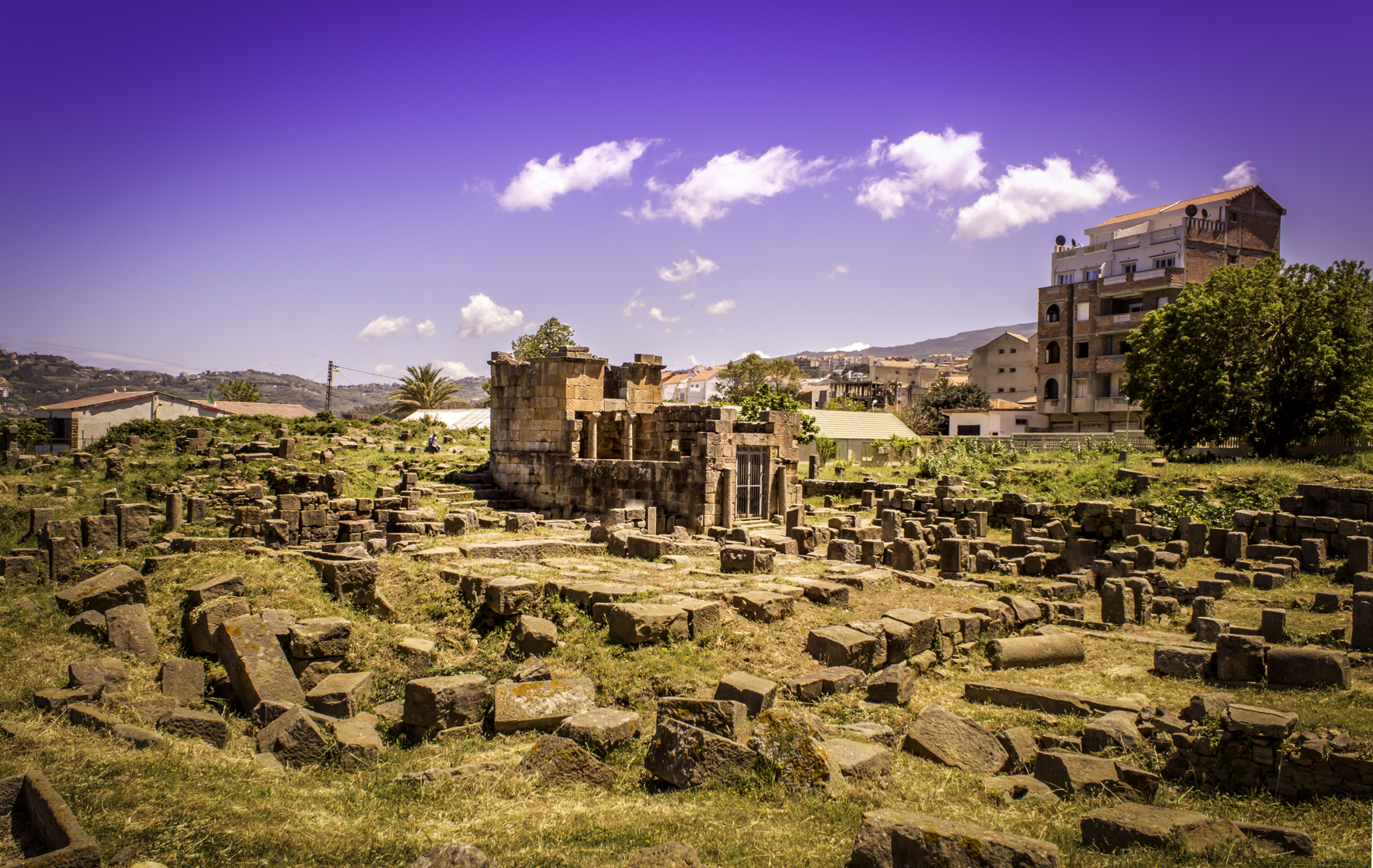
- Tigzirt (Iomnium) Roman archeological site

- Location within Algeria
- 36°53′35″N 4°07′24″E
- Location: Tigzirt, Tizi Ouzou Province, Algeria

Iomnium was a Phoenician, Carthaginian, and Roman port on Algeria's Mediterranean coast at the site of present-day Tigzirt.

== Name ==
Iomnium is a latinization of the town's Punic name, which appears to have combined the elements ʾy (Punic: 𐤀𐤉) and ʾmn (𐤀𐤌𐤍), meaning "Strong Island" or "Peninsula of Strength". The same triliteral root can also mean "craftsman", "artisan", &c.

The city was established as a colony on the maritime trade route between Phoenicia and the Strait of Gibraltar. It was part of the Carthaginian Empire and served as a port for the fortress of Rusippisir (now Taksebt) 3 km to the east. It was therefore one of those comptoirs of which Lancel says that they "occur fairly regularly every 30 or 40 km" along the Algerian coastline". It was one of the key staging points for cabotage along the northern seaboard of the ancient Maghreb.

== Geography ==
Iomnium was located on a peninsula, with the civic buildings located at the end of its cape.

== History ==
The town was established as a colony on the trade route between Phoenicia and the Strait of Gibraltar. It formed part of the Carthaginian Empire and served as the harbor for the fortress at Rusippisir (present-day Taksebt) 3 km (2 mi) to its east.

It fell under Roman hegemony following the Punic Wars. Under Roman rule, Iomnium had the status of a native city (civitas) in the province of Numidia. Excavation has revealed a moderately-sized Roman emporium. It had a forum, temple, courthouse, and magistrates' office. Its Roman streets were laid out on a grid. A public bath and ornamental mosaic have been found, with inscriptions and statues scattered around.

It was conquered with the rest of the area around it during the late 7th century.

Identification of its ruins were long delayed by errors in its mention in the Tabula Peutingeriana, which placed it "42 miles" west of Rusippisir instead of the actual distance of about 2 miles. Iomnium, not Iol, is also probably the Ioulíou (Ancient Greek: Ἰουλίου) mentioned by the Periplus of Pseudo-Scylax, the present text probably representing a scribal error of the original name.

== Ruins ==
=== The Great Basilica ===
The great basilica of Iomnium, also referred to as the cathedral, as it seems likely that a church of this scale housed the seat of the bishop himself, stands between the Byzantine and Roman ramparts, but much closer to the latter, from which it is separated by only a few metres. Two other churches we know of in the city were located in the same way. It was common for new religious buildings to be erected in the suburbs, close to the city walls. In these outlying parts of the cities, where land was less in competition with housing, fairly large sites were still available. At Tipasa, the cathedral church was also positioned in this way, but with an additional feature: due to the imperatives of orientation, it was the main façade that faced the rampart, and not the apse, as was the case at Iomnium.

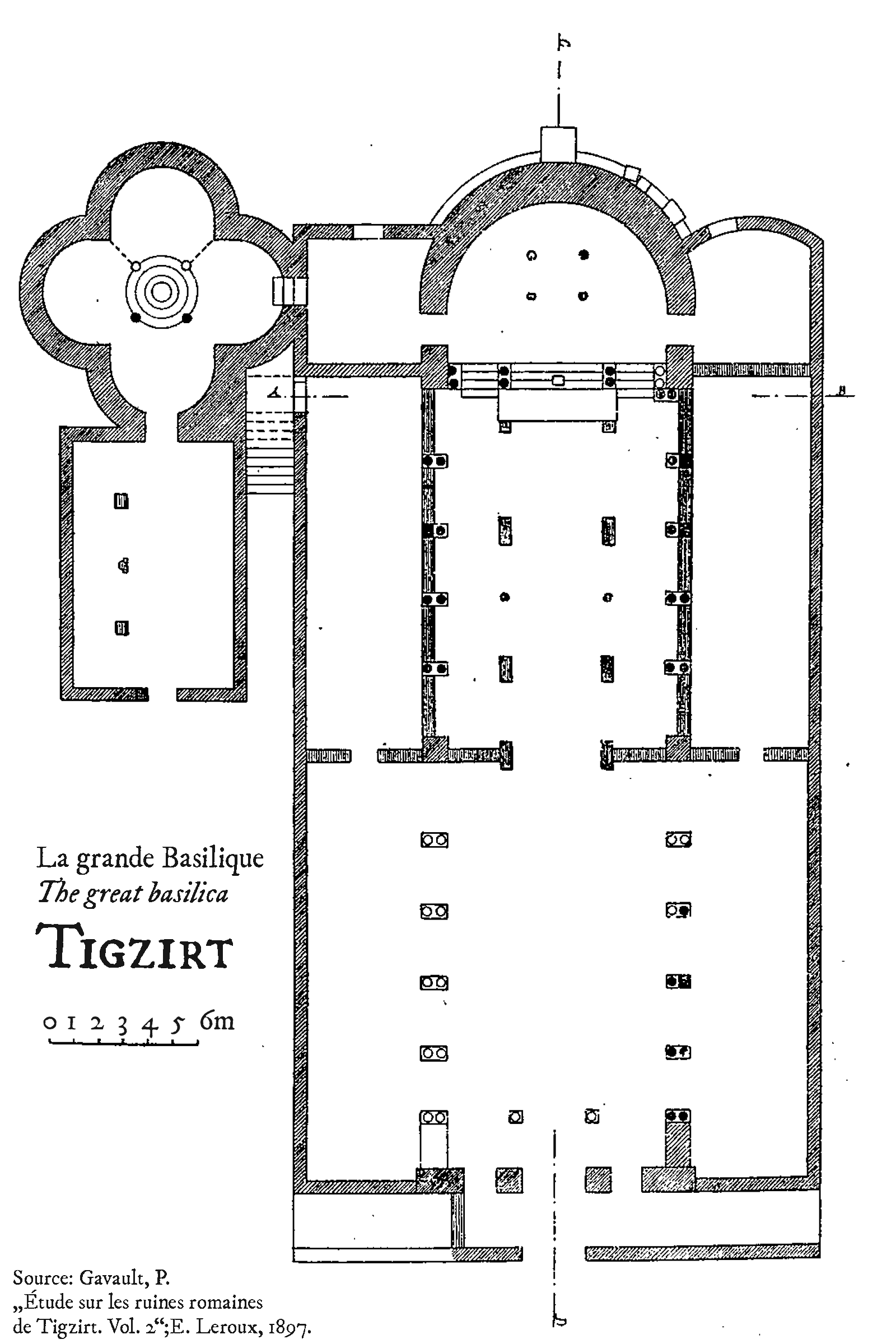
Plan of the basilica of Tigzirt

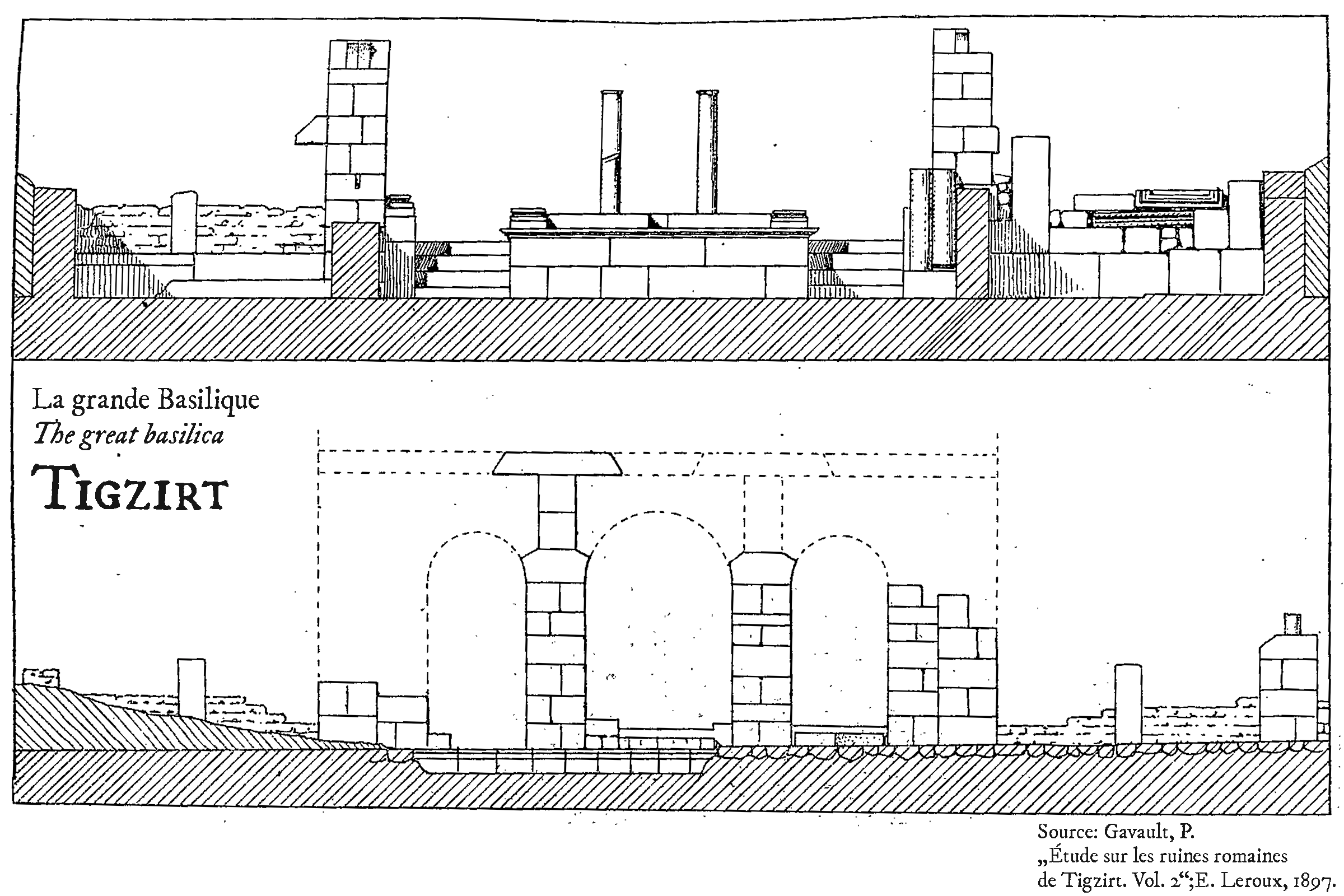
Cross section of the basilica of Tigzirt

The Iomnium portal, on the other hand, seems to have opened onto a street or square, as can be seen from the fairly irregular paving stones covering the ground in front of the entrance. The plan of the building takes the form of a vast rectangle 38 metres long and 21 metres wide, with an arched apse projecting by around 2 metres. A building with a curved silhouette, measuring 11 by 22 metres at its widest point, backs onto the left side.

In accordance with the ritual, the longitudinal axis runs east-west. This orientation was easy to determine in Iomnium, where the main roads, as in most coastal towns, generally followed this direction, which also corresponded to the coastal road.

The outer walls are built in a fairly irregular, small-scale bond, with ashlar courses spaced at 2.20 m to 2.70 m apart. The exception is the façade of the central nave and two-thirds of the south wall, which are built of ashlar of various sizes, laid out in a disorganised manner, with small blocks filling the gaps. It is difficult to determine whether this was a redevelopment phase or a specific construction process in this area. The first hypothesis seems the most likely.

The double colonnades separated the nave from the aisles on both sides. Christian basilicas are characterised by four types of colonnade: those with single columns, the most common; those with square pillars; those combining columns and pillars; and finally, those with double columns, of which there are few known examples in Africa. The Basilica of Iomnium belonged to this last category; however, in the two rows closest to the aisles, pillars sometimes took the place of columns.

The main façade of the church was characterised by ashlar construction for the nave, with walls one metre thick, while the side sections, corresponding to the aisles, were thinner, measuring just 0.60 m. The framework of these sections consisted of stone pillars or chains, surrounded by rubble stonework, which had been partially demolished without the workmen noticing. No doors opened onto the aisles; instead, a triple bay gave access to the nave, framed by four large pillars preserved at varying heights. These doors, which had no rebate, were held shut by crossbars. The pillars of the façade, initially of equal dimensions, were modified to reduce the size of the side doors. The bases of the pillars were made of ashlar, with semi-circular arches above. Some architectural elements, such as T-shaped blocks, were present to reinforce the structure. The bases of the arches rested on overhanging courses, forming cornices or corbels, which took up the entire thickness of the side walls.

Inside, the remains bear witness to the architectural layout of the church. On the left, the colonnade has been largely destroyed, leaving only vague traces. On the right, although partially preserved, it lies on the floor. The columns, ranging in height from 2.95 m to 3.05 m, rested on a dice of earth, with no base of their own. The first bay is partially blocked by a wall separate from the façade pillars, perhaps to reinforce the arcade. Sloping columns rest on debris, while a square pillar replaces a column. The structural changes are evidence of the adaptation of ancient materials to new constructions. Successive bays show toppled columns, revealing the architectural layout. Double columns separate the nave from the apse, while two isolated columns mark the entrance to the apse. The raised apse housed an altar and columns that probably supported a ciborium. Details such as vertical grooves indicate the location of movable barriers. Column bases bear elaborate sculptures, while Christian motifs adorn the door jambs. The adjoining sacristies have internal and external doors, providing a separate entrance for the clergy. Fragments of mosaic reveal the floor levels and staircases that have disappeared. A rubble wall in front of the façade suggests a vestibule, but its exact role remains uncertain.

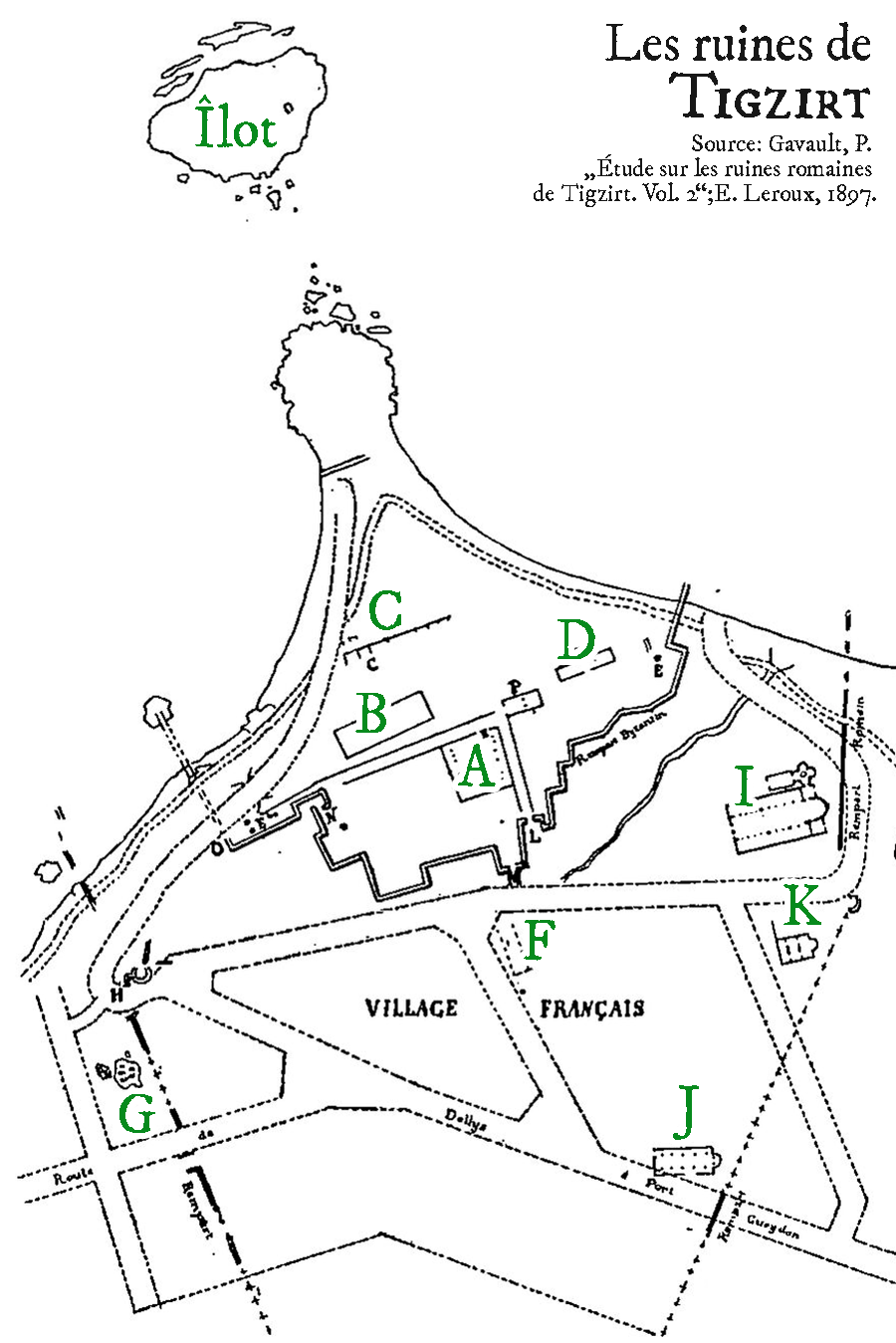
Map of Tigzirt ruins

=== Miscellaneous buildings ===
The building marked A on the attached plan, a vast quadrangle adjacent to the temple, has some remarkable architectural features. Columns have been discovered, some partially buried. Two columns stood upright, with their bases at a depth of 2.50 metres. A significant discovery is an inscription found inside, mentioning the towns of Rûsuccuru and Iomnium, suggesting a civic or religious use, perhaps linked to trade or worship.

Building B (see plan), a large rectangle around 45 metres long, runs parallel to the street leading to the temple. Although it has not been excavated, its architecture and location suggest various interpretations as to its function and importance within the urban complex.

The building marked C on the plan features a large monument near the end of the headland, with a façade approximately 35 metres long. This monumental structure features imposing walls and well-preserved pilasters. The discovery of another building on the western flank of the cape, consisting of terraces rising up to the level of the town, suggests sophisticated urban organisation and intelligent use of the natural relief.

Building D, a square approximately 17 metres long, is located to the east in line with the temple. Despite modifications made during the Berber period, distinctive architectural features have been preserved, including an inscription carved in relief on one of the blocks uncovered, providing valuable information about the building's function and history.

As for Building E, located at the eastern corner of the Byzantine rampart, some remarkable discoveries have been made. In addition to the discovery of two massive columns measuring 3.35 metres in height, atypical architectural features were observed, notably the absence of mouldings on the bases of the columns. This feature, combined with the presence of cylindrical rather than frustoconical columns, raises interesting questions about the origin and architectural evolution of this building.

Building F revealed two rows of parallel pillars when Mr Lécole, the owner, cleared the site. This discovery revealed a large basilica-shaped room measuring around 25 metres in length, with a distance of 6.35 metres between the two rows. Inside one of the bays, a square well measuring 0.70 m by 0.85 m, with a sill and batter, bears witness to the presence of a solid coping. The presumed entrance to the room, aligned on the south axis, is marked by a threshold measuring 1.70 m by 0.60 m, set between two columns with an attic base and an Ionic capital.

It is likely that a column similar to those in buildings E and E bis, but even larger, stands a few metres to the south, close to the street. This remarkable monolith, at least 4 metres high, had a circumference of 1.80 metres, corresponding to a diameter of 0.59 metres. Its cylindrical structure, with no reduction towards the top, shows that it was rudimentary in size.

=== Other basilicas ===
The description of the basilica that has now disappeared, located in the southern part of the town against the Roman wall, reveals foundations buried under the road and lots 30, 31 and 32. A quick sketch was made as the stonemasons took possession of the site. It was a rectangle measuring 25 by 13 metres, divided into three naves by two rows of square pillars, seven or eight in each row. At the end was a deep apse measuring 4.50 by 7 metres.

The crypt basilica, located fifty metres to the south of the main basilica, had a remarkable feature with its two storeys, including a basement. The lower level, explored five years ago, had three slightly lowered barrel vaults, each 3.30 m by 7.20 m, connected by arches. The basement had been transformed into a pothole after being flooded, while the upper floor, backfilled to a depth of around one metre, revealed no visible plan but retained a basilica shape.

The basilica of the necropolis, located on a hill opposite the great basilica, beyond the small ravine (Targa-Roumizga), was identified as a funerary building by Barbier and as a temple by Vigneral. Although a few pagan cemeteries were found in this necropolis, Christian tombs were probably much more numerous. Unfortunately, the ruins of this basilica were used as a source of building materials for the surrounding village, which limited the archaeological discoveries. However, test pits and excavations have revealed the layout of the building, which is certainly of interest, as well as its funerary function.

Facing west, the church takes the form of a rectangle measuring 14.50 m by 1.50 m, with three naves and an apse to the east. The walls, built of rubble with ashlar chains at regular intervals, are not of high quality. Two rows of pillars, each forming five bays, separate the naves. The tympana of the arcades, some of which are inlaid in the Administration building, have been discovered, featuring various motifs such as a six-leaf rosette and a star formed from two interlaced squares.

=== Fortifications ===
The two lines of Roman fortifications that defended the peninsula on which the town was located are clearly visible. The line of the Roman wall, outside and concentric with the Byzantine wall, covers a much larger area, estimated at 10 or 12 hectares. Its careful construction, in small rubble stones bound with hydraulic mortar, is reminiscent of the African fortifications erected under Roman rule from the 1st to 3rd centuries. Round and square towers, as well as a gate defended by a system of rectangular bastions and rounded walls, bear witness to the complexity of this defensive system. Clear traces of the rampart are also visible in the rocks bordering the sea, suggesting a methodical construction that could date back to the reign of the Vandal king Genseric (455-477).

The Byzantine enclosure, which probably dates back to the Byzantine period according to the observations of M. Pallu de Lessert, bears witness to the need for defence and the reduction in population during the decline of Roman power and the Vandal occupation. The wall, built of large cut blocks stacked one on top of the other with no visible cement, is remarkably well preserved along most of its length, although it is often composed of a single course of ashlar. To compensate for this technical inferiority, the enclosure was cleverly designed, with a series of redans and curtain walls featuring narrow gateways, such as the main gate, discovered almost intact with its huge stone hinges and leaves.

The most visible parts of the Byzantine rampart are at its eastern and western ends, where the wall extends into the sea to prevent attacks from the shallow coastline. The construction of the wall, with its two faces made of large ashlars sometimes joined by smaller blocks, is typical of Byzantine fortifications in Africa. Despite signs of hasty construction using salvaged materials, a few Christian decorative elements, such as rosettes and monograms, have been found, suggesting occupation after the time of Genseric.

=== Island ===
As for the island and the port, the islet opposite the peninsula, although now overgrown, shows traces of a past connection with the coast, probably via a masonry causeway. The port itself was located a few kilometres to the east, at the foot of the town of Taksebt. The island, uninhabitable due to its steep slopes, today houses just one ruin, a small vaulted chamber offering a panoramic view over the town.

=== Necropolises ===
As far as necropolises are concerned, the tombs dug into an enormous boulder to the left of the road from Dellys are remarkable. Their shape, rounded on one side and narrowed on the other, is perhaps reminiscent of the anthropoid burials used by the Phoenicians. The dating of these funerary tombs, whose type is attested from the Punic period to late Christianity, remains uncertain.

During roadworks in the 19th century, an atypical tomb was discovered in the southern part of the town, outside the Roman fortifications and quite a distance from the Byzantine wall. The intact tomb was made of flat stones and measured 1.88 m in length. It was covered by three square slabs, one of which bore the letters M F L. This feature suggests a burial that was temporarily hidden for unknown reasons, perhaps linked to religious persecution, such as that associated with Donatism. The location of the tomb, within the oldest city walls, suggests a possible period of abandonment, perhaps during the Vandal period or more recently. The body found was intact, lying on its back, but the soil that had infiltrated between the stones prevented the bones from being preserved, which decomposed over time.

== Epigraphy ==
The Latin epigraphy of Tigzirt is often found on rocks. In 1899, M. Gsell published a long inscription on rock, emphatically celebrating the precautions taken to prevent herds from falling into precipices Another inscription, "AVGSR" which should read "A'ug(usti) s(um,ma) r(atio)", interpreted as that of a boundary between a property of the Emperor and that of a town or private individual, was discovered further on. The inscriptions reveal the ancient economic and social organisation of the region, highlighting the foresight of the wealthy, represented by the providentia bonorum. The presence of large landowners, including the emperor, suggests a landscape characterised by vast estates, private properties and imperial lands.

Sculptures of phalluses in high relief are frequently seen in the ruins, often alone or in confrontation. Two opposing phalluses can be seen on a limestone block near the citadel gate, with an epigraphic fragment beneath another. Although the precise meaning of this fragment is unknown, these sculptures seem to have had a prophylactic role, protecting against the evil eye and foreseeing the malicious intentions of the envious. Another document of a pornographic nature has been found. On a sandstone slab measuring approximately 0.51 x 0.76 x 0.09 metres, an unartistic representation is carved in bas-relief, characterised by its indecency, which made it difficult to describe at the beginning of the 20th century. To the right of the scene, a phallus is depicted, topped by a vase, aligned with a female figure standing and facing, dressed in a short dress and elaborate hairstyle. She hides the lower part of her face, which she supports with her half-extended arms. Above the phallus, two lines engraved in characters 15 mm high bear the following three words: "Bibe, mandu[c]a, suc[c]ur[re]", which could be translated as the imperative verbs "drink, eat and relieve". Yet another clearly pornographic text (which could be translated as "Zozimus to Victoria, greetings. Please help me in my time of need. If you can...", expressing a tribute paid by a soldier to the indulgence of one of the women in the garrison) would have been discovered 8 km away, in the douar Iguonan, where the remains of the two Roman castles built to guard the road from Tigzirt to the Sebaou still remain on the heights of the region.

A dedication mentions the enlargement of a portico in the sanctuary of a barely transformed Baal is attributed to the 2nd century mentions the adornment of the temple of the unconquered god Frugifer and the enlargement of the new portico intended for sacred ceremonies. This dedication underlines the importance of inner courtyards, veritable sacred forecourts or porticoes, in the life of sanctuaries built in Africa in Roman times in honour of Punic deities more or less transformed by the prevailing syncretism.

== Ancient oil mills and presses ==
Several ancient oil mills and presses have been discovered near Iomnium. Most of the oil mills in the Tigzirt and Taksebt region appeared to have a similar plan, with small buildings divided into two rooms, only one of which showed remains of a press. The walls were built of blockwork reinforced with harps, with a wooden press anchored in the stone. The monolithic pressing table was supported by four ashlars, with grooves for the liquid. A counterweight was probably used to press the scourtins (a sieve or filter traditionally used in olive oil production to separate the oil from the solids in the olive paste). Next to the press was a large rectangular table with a smooth surface, indicating a wooden device for crushing the olives.

Other oil mills were carved directly into the rock. This rustic version of a classic technique appears, at least here, to be linked to small tenures. Thus, along the entire coastal range, many rocky outcrops feature basins and grooves, falsely interpreted by early Europeans as sacrificial stones where the blood of victims flowed. Near Tigzirt, at Tensa, a press in the rock is unusable because of three cupules dug into the treading area; however, the women of the village still used it until the 1970s to crush olives. These oil mills, often confused with military posts in the past, were spread relatively evenly across the region. It is possible that not all of these rock-cut oil mills operated simultaneously. Some may well predate the most prosperous period of Iomnium and Rusippisir (late 2nd century, early 3rd century).

However, their distribution suggests that many of them were built at the same time. The proliferation of these oil mills implies a fairly high population density, which was difficult to accommodate entirely within the two narrow enclosures of Tigzirt and Taksebt. Here and there are traces of isolated houses with dry stone walls, which are old but difficult to date. On the other hand, a small ancient village surrounded by a dry-stone enclosure crowns the ridge at 830 metres altitude and has been clearly identified, which was probably not the only one in the region. The absence of large settlements on large estates suggests exploitation by small tenures, with the urban notables owning the land but the peasants cultivating it. On the Kabyle coast, there were no large farms, but rather small holdings. The territory of Tigzirt, although limited, was organised in a simple manner, probably influenced by the history of the surrounding towns, and there is much to suggest that Roman settlement forced the natives to migrate to more remote lands.

== Religion ==
Iomnium was the seat of a Christian bishopric in antiquity. The ruins of a small basilica have been uncovered. The building has three naves with galleries over the aisles. There was a baptistery of polyfoil plan to the northeast.

The diocese was revived by the Roman Catholic Church as a titular see. The current bishop is Jaime Calderón Calderón.
