= SS Zachary Taylor =

World War II Liberty ship of the United States

History

United States
- Name: Zachary Taylor
- Namesake: Zachary Taylor
- Builder: Richmond Shipyards, Richmond, California
- Yard number: 44
- Way number: 7
- Laid down: 6 October 1941
- Launched: 28 February 1942
- Fate: Scrapped, 1961

General characteristics
- Type: Liberty ship
- Tonnage: 7,000 long tons deadweight (DWT)
- Length: 441 ft 6 in (134.57 m)
- Beam: 56 ft 11 in (17.35 m)
- Draft: 27 ft 9 in (8.46 m)
- Propulsion: Two oil-fired boilers; Triple expansion steam engine; Single screw; 2,500 hp (1,864 kW)
- Speed: 11 knots (20 km/h; 13 mph)
- Capacity: 9,140 tons cargo
- Complement: 41
- Armament: 1 × Stern-mounted 4 in (100 mm) deck gun; AA guns

SS Zachary Taylor (MC contract 244) was a Liberty ship built in the United States during World War II. She was named after Zachary Taylor, the twelfth President of the United States.

The ship was laid down by Permanente Metals in their Richmond Yard #2 on 6 October 1941, then launched on 28 February 1942. After the war she went on to suffer the same fate as most of the other surviving Liberty ships: she was scrapped in 1961.

After the end of World War II, Zachary Taylor was used to bring displaced European immigrants (mostly Jews) to New York City.. She docked at Brooklyn, New York at the Brooklyn Army Terminal on 19 September 1949.

== See also ==
- Convoy UGS-40
