= SS John W. Griffiths =

World War II Liberty ship of the United States

History

United States
- Name: John W. Griffiths
- Namesake: John W. Griffiths
- Owner: War Shipping Administration (WSA)
- Operator: Blidberg & Rothchild Co., Inc.
- Ordered: as type (EC2-S-C1) hull, MC hull 1548
- Builder: J.A. Jones Construction, Panama City, Florida
- Cost: $1,384,690
- Yard number: 30
- Way number: 5
- Laid down: 13 December 1943
- Launched: 9 February 1944
- Completed: 25 March 1944
- Identification: Call Signal: KWBN
- Fate: Laid up in National Defense Reserve Fleet, James River Group, Lee Hall, Virginia, 19 May 1946; Sold to Italy, 7 January 1947

Italy
- Name: Dino
- Owner: Corrado Societe di Navigazione, Genoa, Italy
- Acquired: 7 January 1947
- Fate: Sold, 1963

Italy
- Name: Imera
- Owner: Sicilarma Societe di Navigazione per Azioni, Genoa, Italy
- Acquired: 1963
- Fate: Scrapped, 1965

General characteristics
- Class & type: Liberty ship; type EC2-S-C1, standard
- Tonnage: 10,865 LT DWT; 7,176 GRT
- Displacement: 3,380 long tons (3,434 t) (light); 14,245 long tons (14,474 t) (max)
- Length: 441 feet 6 inches (135 m) oa; 416 feet (127 m) pp; 427 feet (130 m) lwl
- Beam: 57 feet (17 m)
- Draft: 27 ft 9.25 in (8.4646 m)
- Installed power: 2 × Oil fired 450 °F (232 °C) boilers, operating at 220 psi (1,500 kPa); 2,500 hp (1,900 kW)
- Propulsion: 1 × triple-expansion steam engine, (manufactured by Iron Fireman Manufacturing Co., Portland, Oregon); 1 × screw propeller
- Speed: 11.5 knots (21.3 km/h; 13.2 mph)
- Capacity: 562,608 cubic feet (15,931 m^{3}) (grain); 499,573 cubic feet (14,146 m^{3}) (bale)
- Complement: 38–62 USMM; 21–40 USNAG
- Armament: Varied by ship; Bow-mounted 3-inch (76 mm)/50-caliber gun; Stern-mounted 4-inch (102 mm)/50-caliber gun; 2–8 × single 20-millimeter (0.79 in) Oerlikon anti-aircraft (AA) cannons and/or, 2–8 × 37-millimeter (1.46 in) M1 AA guns

SS John W. Griffiths was a Liberty ship built in the United States during World War II. She was named after John W. Griffiths, a naval architect who was influential in his design of clipper ships.

== Construction ==
John W. Griffiths was laid down on 13 December 1943, under a Maritime Commission (MARCOM) contract, MC hull 1548, by J.A. Jones Construction, Panama City, Florida; she was launched on 9 February 1944.

== History ==
She was allocated to Blidberg & Rothchild Co., Inc., on 25 March 1944. On 19 May 1946, she was laid up in the National Defense Reserve Fleet, in the James River Group, in Lee Hall, Virginia. On 7 January 1947, she was transferred to the Italian Government, which in turn sold her to Corrado Socite di Navigazione, Genoa, Italy, for $544,506, on 10 January 1947. She was renamed Dino. In 1963, she was sold to Sicilarma Societe di Navigazione per Azioni, Genoa, and renamed Imera. She was scrapped in Spezia in 1965.

== See also ==
- Convoy UGS-40

== Bibliography ==
- "Jones Construction, Panama City FL". www.ShipbuildingHistory.com. 13 October 2010.
- "Liberty Ships – World War II".
- Maritime Administration. "John W. Griffiths". Ship History Database Vessel Status Card. U.S. Department of Transportation, Maritime Administration. Archived from the original on 12 December 2019.
- Davies, James (May 2004). "Specifications (As-Built)" (PDF). p. 23.
- "SS John W. Griffiths".
