= SS James J. Pettigrew =

World War II Liberty ship of the United States

History

United States
- Name: James J. Pettigrew
- Namesake: J. Johnston Pettigrew
- Builder: North Carolina Shipbuilding Company, Wilmington, North Carolina
- Yard number: 52
- Way number: 7
- Laid down: 24 November 1942
- Launched: 24 December 1942
- Honors and awards: 1 × battle star
- Fate: Scrapped 1960

General characteristics
- Type: Liberty ship
- Tonnage: 7,000 long tons deadweight (DWT)
- Length: 441 ft 6 in (134.57 m)
- Beam: 56 ft 11 in (17.35 m)
- Draft: 27 ft 9 in (8.46 m)
- Propulsion: Two oil-fired boilers; Triple expansion steam engine; Single screw; 2,500 hp (1,864 kW)
- Speed: 11 knots (20 km/h; 13 mph)
- Capacity: 9,140 tons cargo
- Complement: 41
- Armament: 1 × Stern-mounted 4 in (100 mm) deck gun; AA guns

SS James J. Pettigrew (MC contract 874) was a Liberty ship built in the United States during World War II. She was named after J. Johnston Pettigrew, a Confederate general from North Carolina killed during the American Civil War.

The ship was laid down by North Carolina Shipbuilding Company in their Cape Fear River yard on November 24, 1942, and launched on December 24, 1942. Pettigrew was chartered to Moore-McCormack Lines, Inc., by the War Shipping Administration until entering the James River Fleet of the National Defense Reserve Fleet in January 1946. At the time she required more than $100,000 of repairs. The vessel was sold for scrap in 1967.

== Awards ==
Pettigrew's Naval Armed Guard detachment received one battle star for World War II service. On May 11, 1944 while part of convoy UGS-40 Pettigrew came under heavy air attack. The convoy managed to fight off an attack that included bombs, torpedoes, and glide bombs without casualties.

== See also ==
- Convoy UGS-40
