= Tigzirt =

- Commune and town
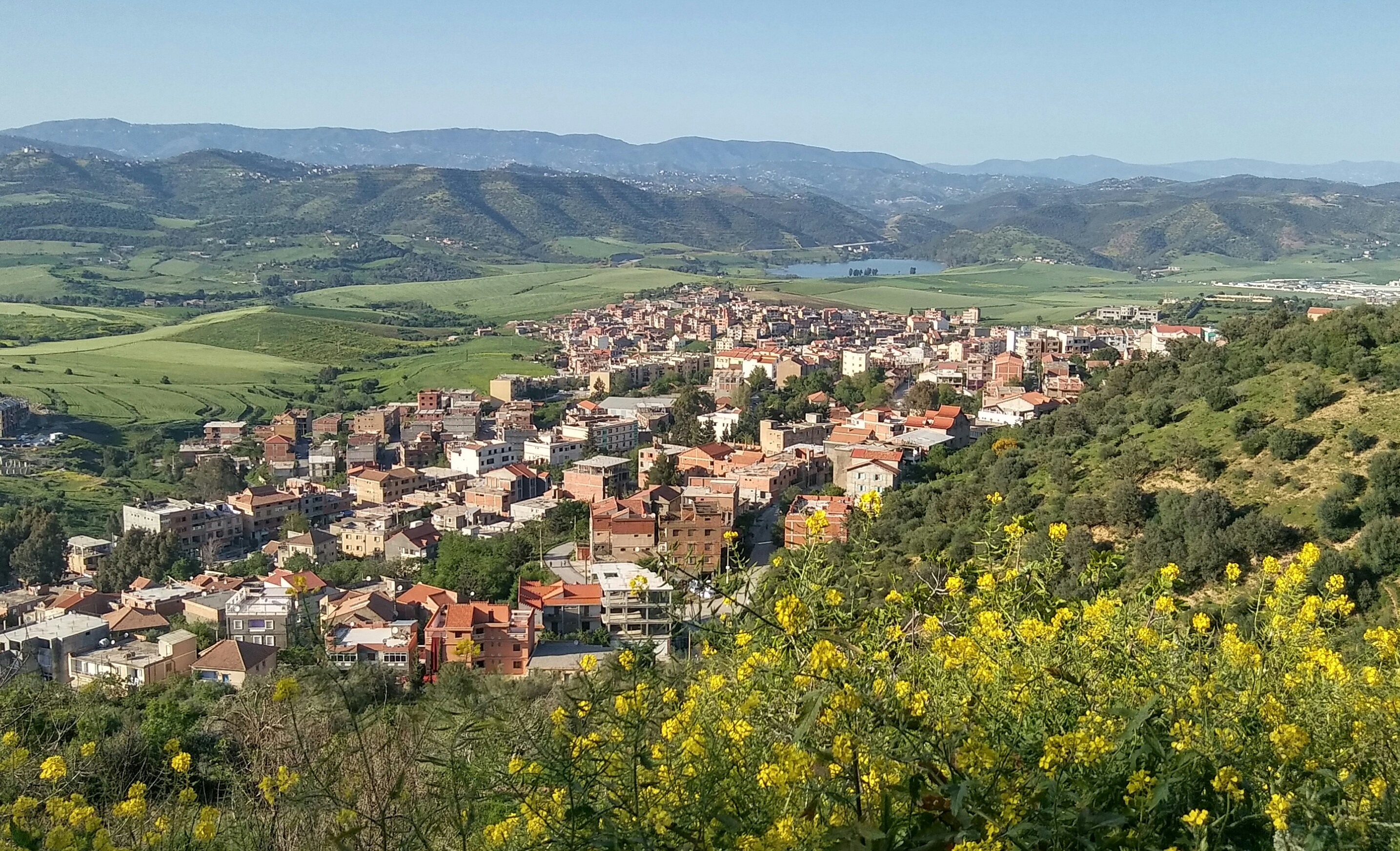
- Tigzirt

- Location within Algeria
- Coordinates: 36.888889°N 5.125°E
- Country: Algeria
- Province: Tizi Ouzou Province

Area
  - Total: 1,609 sq mi (4,168 km^{2})

Population (2008)
  - Total: 11,962
- Time zone: UTC+1 (CET)

Tigzirt, the classical Iomnium, is a small town on the coast of northeast Algeria in Tizi Ouzou Province. It has a sleepy demeanor and attracts many tourists especially in summer from all over the country.

== Name ==
Tigzirt's name derives from the Kabyle word for "island", Tigzirt.

== History ==
The town was established as a Phoenician colony on a small and easily defended peninsula. Under the Romans, Iomnium was a small port town.

The modern town of Tigzirt was founded in 1888

== Tourism ==
The ruins of a Christian basilica from the 5th century or 6th century are there, situated in the middle of Tigzirt.

The beach is only average in its appeal, as it is stony. It is sheltered and tucked beneath the hills which separate it from Tizi-Ouzou. A local tourist office is open in the summer months and there are lodging quarters at the Hotel el Awres on main street. A few kilometers to the east is located the more upscale Hotel Mizrana.

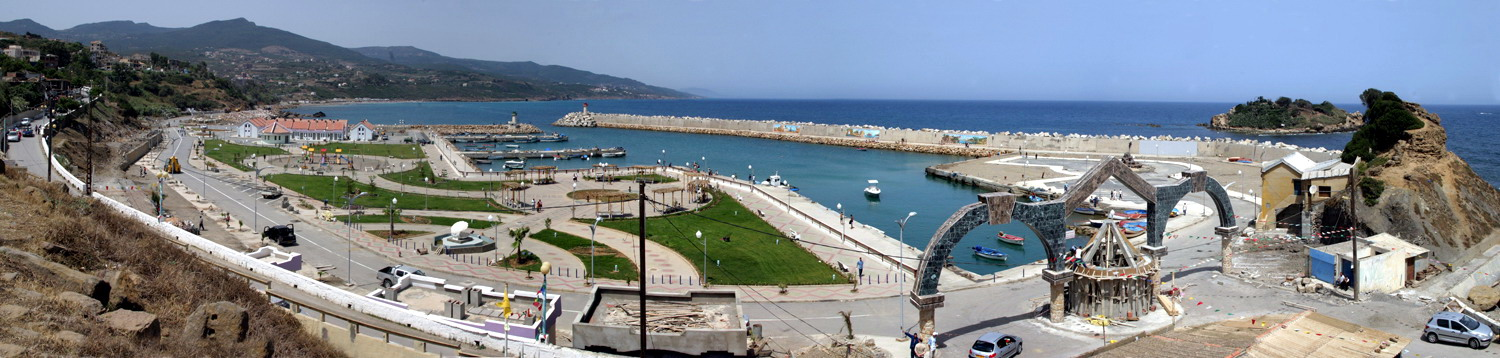
Overview of the port of Tigzirt
