= USS John R. Pierce =

Allen M. Sumner-class destroyer

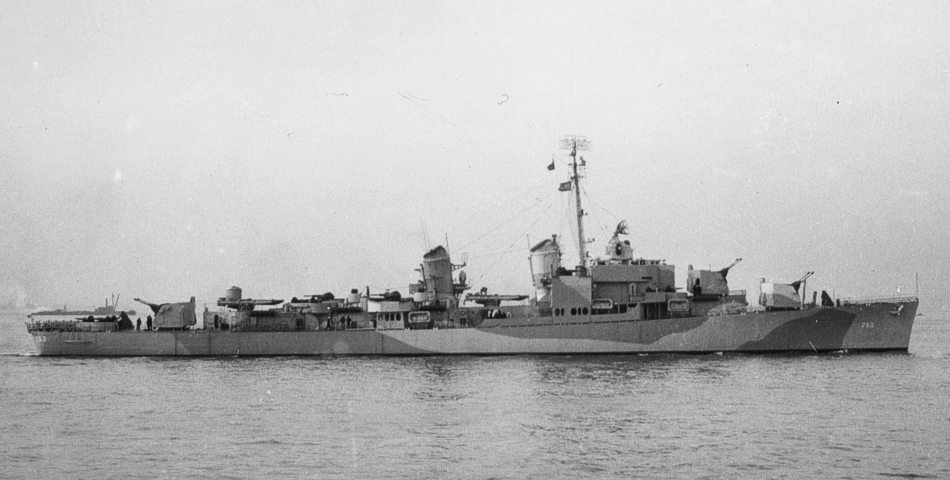
- USS John R. Pierce

History

United States
- Name: John R. Pierce
- Namesake: John Reeves Pierce
- Builder: Bethlehem Mariners Harbor, Staten Island, New York
- Laid down: 24 March 1944
- Launched: 1 September 1944
- Commissioned: 30 December 1944
- Decommissioned: c.1973
- Stricken: 1 July 1973
- Motto: Swift and Sure
- Fate: Sold 6 November 1974 and broken up for scrap.

General characteristics
- Class & type: Allen M. Sumner-class destroyer
- Displacement: 2,200 tons
- Length: 376 ft 6 in (114.76 m)
- Beam: 40 ft (12 m)
- Draft: 15 ft 8 in (4.78 m)
- Propulsion: 60,000 shp (45,000 kW); 2 propellers
- Speed: 34 knots (63 km/h; 39 mph)
- Range: 6,500 nmi (12,000 km; 7,500 mi) at 15 kn (28 km/h; 17 mph)
- Complement: 336
- Armament: 6 × 5 in (127 mm)/38 cal. guns, 12 × 40 mm AA guns, 11 × 20 mm AA guns, 10 × 21 inch (533 mm) torpedo tubes, 6 × depth charge projectors, 2 × depth charge tracks

USS John R. Pierce (DD-753), an Allen M. Sumner-class destroyer, is the only ship of the United States Navy to be named for Lieutenant Commander John Reeves Pierce.

== Namesake ==
John Reeves Pierce was born on 3 November 1906 in Cristóbal, Colón, Panama Canal Zone. He graduated from the United States Naval Academy in 1928. Following flight training and submarine instruction, he served on the submarine USS S-29 and studied marine engineering at the University of California. After serving on USS Nautilus and USS Narwhal, he assumed command of USS S-23 on 15 February 1941. Appointed Lieutenant Commander on 2 January 1942, on 22 June he took command of USS Argonaut, a transport submarine, which participated with Nautilus in carrying out the Raid on Makin Island from 17 to 19 August.

On 10 January 1943 during its third war patrol in the Southwest Pacific, Argonaut sighted an Imperial Japanese Navy convoy protected by planes and destroyers. Built as the first large minelaying submarine, Argonaut lacked proper submergible maneuverability during combat operations. When detected, it came under a vicious enemy attack, Argonaut surfaced and pressed home an aggressive counterattack, severely damaging a Japanese destroyer before succumbing to heavy enemy fire. Pierce was posthumously awarded the Navy Cross.

== Construction and commissioning ==
John R. Pierce was laid down by the Bethlehem Steel Co., Staten Island, New York on 24 March 1944 and launched on 1 September 1944; sponsored by Mrs. Mary Taylor Pierce, widow of Lieutenant Commander Pierce. The ship was commissioned on 30 December 1944 at Brooklyn Navy Yard.

== Service history ==
=== World War II ===
Following her shakedown cruise off Bermuda, John R. Pierce operated out of Norfolk, Virginia during the spring of 1945, where she trained destroyer crews and conducted antisubmarine warfare (ASW) patrols along the eastern seaboard. She sailed on 17 June for duty in the Pacific, and arrived at Pearl Harbor on 6 July. Later, on 12 August, she departed as escort for an aircraft carrier-cruiser striking force sent to attack Wake Island, where she was ordered to cease offensive operations on 15 August. She then proceeded via Eniwetok to Japan and arrived Wakayama, Honshū on 15 September as escort for a convoy of occupation troops. Her crew members were the first Americans to enter Hiroshima after the atomic bomb attack.

=== Post war ===
For the next three months, she operated in the Japanese Inland Sea, covering occupation landings and assisting in the liberation of Allied POWs. She sailed on 21 December from Kure, Honshū, to Shanghai, China, to support the Chinese Nationalists in their conflict with the Communists for control of the mainland. She also conducted the "North China Omnibus Courier Run" between China and Korea until 6 March 1946, when she departed Qingdao, China, for the United States.

She arrived at San Francisco on 27 March, and was deactivated 16 September. John R. Pierce then sailed for San Diego on 17 January 1947, decommissioned 24 January and entered the San Diego Group, Pacific Reserve Fleet on 1 May.

John R. Pierce was recommissioned on 11 April 1949. Assigned to the Atlantic Fleet, she departed on 11 July for Norfolk. Arriving on 5 August, she commenced twelve months of Atlantic operations that extended from Greenland to the Panama Canal Zone. Under the command of Commander J. R. Wadleigh, she cleared Norfolk on 8 August 1950 for duty with the 6th Fleet. Before she returned to the United States on 23 January 1951, she operated in the Mediterranean from Gibraltar to Crete and along the western coast of Europe from England to Norway.

=== Korea ===
For more than 15 months, John R. Pierce operated out of Norfolk along the Atlantic coast; then she departed on 15 May 1952 for duty in the Far East. Sailing via the Panama Canal, San Diego and Pearl Harbor, she arrived Yokosuka, Japan on 18 June. She sailed on 20 June for blockade and bombardment operations against Communist forces along the east coast of Korea. From Chongjin to Songjin, she conducted interdiction firing and "anti-mine, anti-junk and anti-fishing" patrols. While engaging enemy shore batteries at Songjin on 6 August, she sustained three hits from enemy fire, but continued interdiction patrols until 11 October. She then departed for the United States via the Indian Ocean, Suez and Gibraltar, arriving Norfolk 12 December.

=== 1954–1973 ===
From 5 January 1954 to 1 April 1962 John R. Pierce deployed to the Mediterranean on six cruises of varying duration. When not conducting operations with the 6th Fleet, she operated out of her home port on training exercises and readiness operations in the Atlantic and the Caribbean. When in the Mediterranean, fleet operations carried her the length and breadth of the sea, and deployments in 1954 and 1956 sent her, in addition, to the coast of Western Europe.

On 1 October 1956, 75 miles south of Villefranche-sur-Mer, the ship was on aerial gunnery exercise firing at a towed aerial target, when at 0950, a shell exploded in the breech of mount 53, killing a member of the mount and seriously wounding nine others. Three of the injured were in grave condition and later died. Doctors from Salem were taken by helicopter to the destroyer, and then transferred the wounded to the cruiser at sea. Then, Salem took the men to Villefranche to be transported to Nice Airport, France, where a C-119 Flying Boxcar waited to fly them to a military hospital in Frankfurt, Germany. One of the seriously wounded was Ensign John T. Pierce, son of John R. Pierce, for whom the ship was named. After the wounded were transferred, John R. Pierce went to Cannes, France, and arrived on 2 October. She stayed there until 15 October and then got under way for the states. She refueled at São Miguel in the Azores on 20 October and again in Bermuda on 25 October, arriving in Norfolk on 27 October. From there, she went to the Philadelphia Naval Yard for repairs.

Engaged primarily in conducting ASW barrier patrols and screening carrier flight operations, John R. Pierce responded when the Syrian Army threatened King Hussein's pro-Western government of Jordan during August and September 1957, destroyers, including John r. Pierce, patrolled the sea lanes of the Eastern Mediterranean and the Red Sea to guard against possible intervention by Egypt. She returned to the same area in December 1958 to bolster the security of Lebanon, recently threatened by the Soviet-backed United Arab Republic. Following the assassination of General Trujillo on 27 May 1961, the destroyer patrolled off the Dominican Republic.

Returning to Norfolk 1 April 1962 from her seventh Mediterranean cruise, she sailed on 15 May to participate in Project Mercury recovery operations following Lieutenant Commander M. Scott Carpenter's scheduled three-orbit flight in Aurora 7. On 24 April she steamed 206 miles at flank speed from her designated position in the Atlantic Recovery Area east of Puerto Rico and recovered the floating space capsule. After delivering it safely at Roosevelt Roads, Puerto Rico, the next day, she returned to Norfolk 28 May before resuming duty in the Caribbean.

During the Cuban Missile Crisis, under the command of Commander J. W. Foust, John R. Pierce departed Norfolk 22 October; joined the quarantine force on 24 October; and during the next five days, investigated 13 ships. On 28 October, the Soviets agreed to the American demands, thus alleviating a tense and crucial crisis. John R. Pierce departed from her assigned position the following day, but she continued a Caribbean sea-vigil from Jamaica to the Canal Zone until returning to Norfolk 14 December.

She departed home port on 29 March 1963 for the Mediterranean and the Middle East. After two weeks of maneuvers with the 6th Fleet, she transited the Suez Canal on 30 April and commenced an 11-week cruise through the Red Sea, the Arabian Sea, and the Persian Gulf. Returning to the Mediterranean 16 July, she resumed fleet operations. On 14 August she rescued three survivors of a plane that splashed off her starboard bow while attempting an emergency landing on Enterprise. Departing Palma, Mallorca, 24 August, she arrived Norfolk 4 September.

John R. Pierce spent the next year operating out of Norfolk; and during off-shore surveillance patrols in January 1964 she escorted five Cuban boats, which were illegally fishing in U.S. territorial waters, to Key West for internment. Once again she departed Norfolk for the Mediterranean 8 October. Reaching Naples late in the month, she joined the 6th Fleet and through the remainder of the year operated along the western coast of Italy.

John R. Pierce returned to Norfolk 27 February 1965. She reported to Commandant of the 3rd Naval District in Brooklyn, New York, for duty as a reserve training ship and began a schedule of 2-week training cruises for naval reservists. She continued this duty into 1973.

== Awards ==
John R. Pierce received one battle star for service during the Korean War.

== In popular culture ==
John R. Pierce's actions during the Cuban Missile Crisis are depicted in the 2000 movie Thirteen Days. In the film, the ship is portrayed by the Gearing-class destroyer USS Joseph P. Kennedy Jr..
