= Zamoum =

Zamoum is a surname. Notable people with the surname include:

- Fatma Zohra Zamoum (born 1967), Franco-Algerian writer, filmmaker, and educator
- Mohamed ben Zamoum (1795–1843), Algerian marabout and leader against French conquest of Algeria
- Omar ben Zamoum (1836–1898), Algerian leader against French conquest of Algeria

== See also ==
- Laazib Zamoum, a town in Algeria
