= Naciria (disambiguation) =

Naciria is a town and commune in Algeria.

Naciria may also refer to:

- Naciria District, a district in Algeria
- 2008 Naciria bombing, a terrorist attack in Algeria
