= Chender =

- Motto: شندر
- Interactive map of Chender
- Commune: Naciria
- District: Naciria District
- Province: Boumerdès Province
- Region: Kabylie
- Country: Algeria

Area
  - Total: 4.8 km^{2} (1.9 sq mi)

Dimensions
  - Length: 2 km (1.2 mi)
  - Width: 2.4 km (1.5 mi)
- Elevation: 410 m (1,350 ft)
- Time zone: UTC+01:00
- Area code: 35006

Chender is a village in the Boumerdès Province in Kabylie, Algeria.

== Location ==
The village is surrounded by Chender River and Sebaou River, and the towns of Naciria and Bordj Menaïel.

== Notable people ==
- Mohamed ben Zamoum
- Omar ben Zamoum
