= Tadmaït =

Tadmaït ⵜⴰⴷⵎⴰⵉⵜ - Tadmayt تادمايت Camp-du-Maréchal
- Commune and town
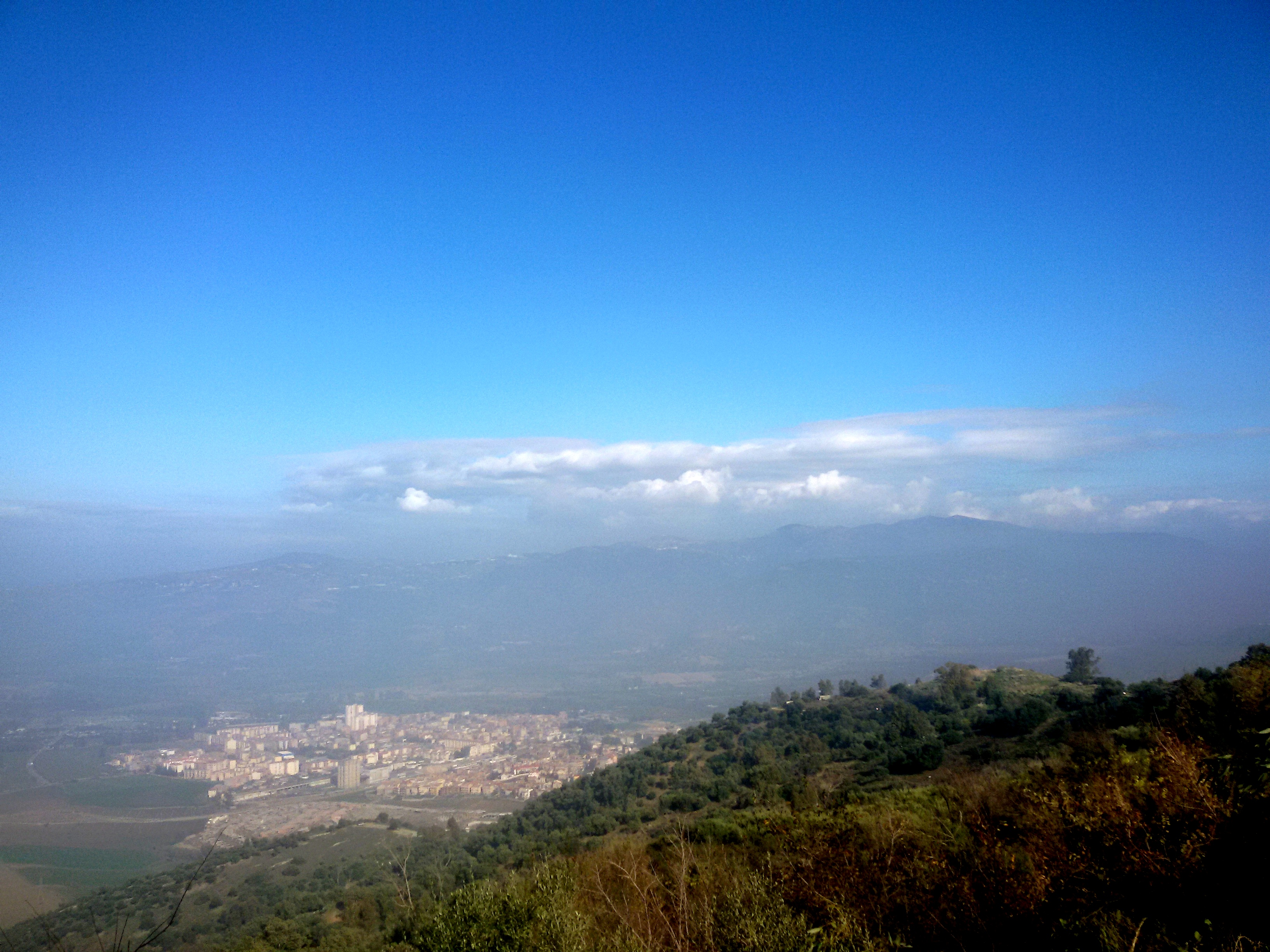
- Vue of the capital of Tadmait's commune, from the heights of Mount Sidi Ali Bounab.

- Localisation of Tadmait's town in Tizi-Ouzou

- Location within Algeria Location within Africa Tadmaït (Earth)
- Coordinates: 36°44′34″N 3°54′07″E
- Country: Algeria
- Province: Tizi Ouzou Province

Government
  - Type: Municipal People's Assembly
  - President of MPA: CHAOU Ahcene (since 2017)

Area
  - Total: 2,458 sq mi (6,366 km^{2})

Population (2008)
  - Total: 22,838
  - Density: 930/sq mi (359/km^{2})
- Time zone: UTC+1 (CET)
- Postal Code: 15018

Tadmaït (Tamazight: ⵜⴰⴷⵎⴰⵉⵜ pronounced Thadhmaith, Arabic: تادمايت, previously Camp-du-Maréchal i.e. Marshal's Camp) is a town and commune in Tizi Ouzou Province in northern Algeria, located 18 kilometers west of Tizi Ouzou and 85 kilometers east of Algiers.

The city covers an area of 63.66 km² (39.55 sq mi) and had a population of 22838 in 2008 (density: 359 inhab/km²)

== History ==
Camp-du-Maréchal was a colonial village created in lower Kabylia, became Tadmaït in 1963, just after the independence of Algeria

=== French occupation ===
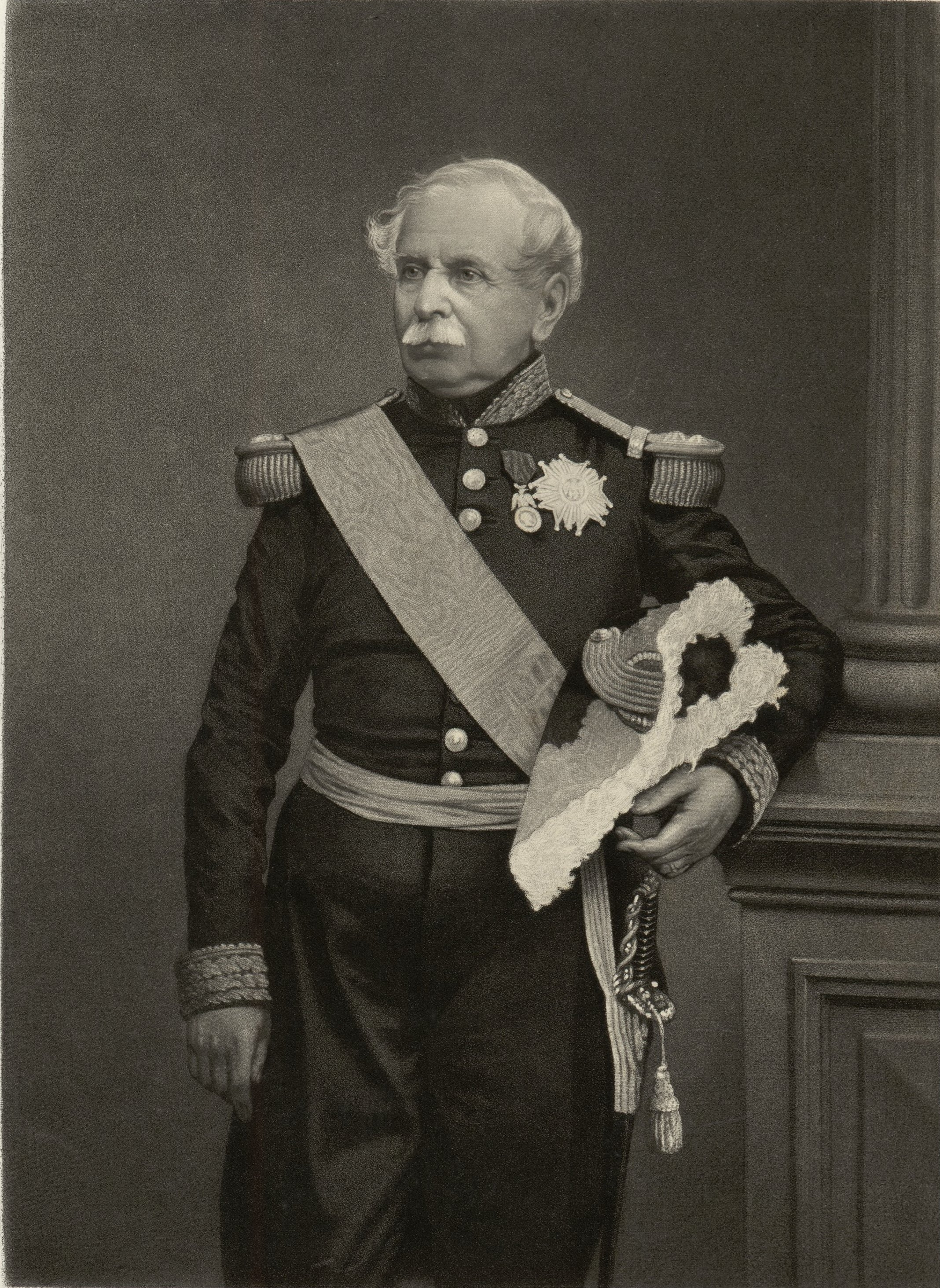
Marshal Jacques Louis Randon

On 14 June 1830, French troops land at Sidi-Ferruch, and enter Algiers on 5 July. About ten years later, Marshal Bugeaud decided to conquer Kabylia. He occupies Bordj Menaiel, 66 kilometers east of Algiers. Then he heads north and occupied Dellys, a coastal town founded during the Turkish presence. When returning from Dellys, going up the Sebaou, he enter the plain of Tadmaït that he occupies. The indigenous population takes refuge at Mount Sidi Ali Bounab and is divided into Thouddar (hamlets).

The marshal established a large camp in preparation for the occupation of the rest of Kabylia. West of the camp (about 6 kilometers), a center is founded by the Society for the protection of Alsatians-Lorrainers remained French (founded in 1871) presided by Count Joseph d'Haussonville. Since 1873, 33 families have settled. At the site of the camp is founded in 1879 a village which will bear the name of the marshal (Marshal Randon).

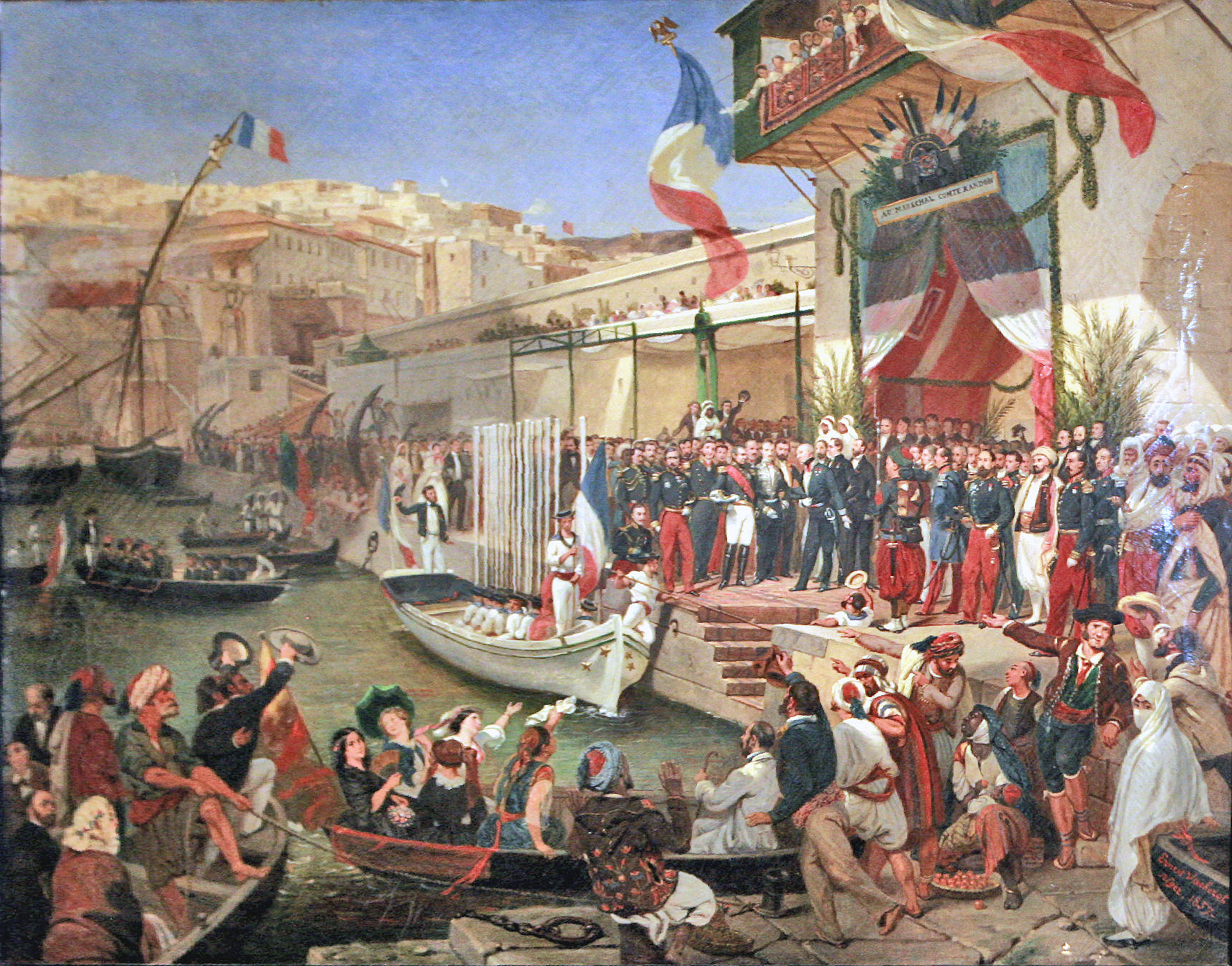
Arrival of Marshal Randon in Algiers in 1857

Taking advantage of the experience, it is, of all the Alsatian villages, the most successful. It's immediately equipped with all the basic infrastructure: town hall, post office, school, church built by native workers. The village is designed only for the needs of settlers and the colonial administration. The fertile lands watered by the Sebaou, are exploited in the same way as the workers who work from sunrise to sunset. That's why the settlers ask to be grouped near the village so that they are more efficient. This is how Tadmaït was born, a group of makeshift dwelling 100 metres high in the village. Other infrastructures are set up such as the college and the dispensary managed by Les soeurs Blanches, railways connecting the village to Algiers and Dellys to transport the productions to Algiers than France. The Marshal's Camp / Camp-du-Maréchal is best known for its vineyards and two wineries (for the production of wine), its orange groves and especially for its tobacco. The " Green olives of Kabylia " produced by the Gayraud house, regularly awarded in the 1930s, were famous even on the European continent.

=== The independence War ===
Several attacks were perpetrated in 1955, people began to join the maquis to take up arms. One of the major events of this war is the one-night attack of 1956 against two depots, one with ammunition and the other with tobacco.

To cope with the new situation, military reinforcements are sent to the village and a barracks is built 500 meters west of Tadmaït. To facilitate access to the maquis and track the mujahideen, roads are open to Mount Sidi Ali Bounab. Starting on 6 p.m, the village is forbidden to the natives. A slum near the station is improvised to accommodate families fleeing the mountain. A city made up of solid houses, two to three rooms is built to accommodate the harkis. Mount Sidi Ali Bounab will not respite until 1962, the Camp-du-Maréchal lost during this war nearly 1000 inhabitants.

=== After independence ===
In 1963, Camp Marshal took the name of Tadmaït. A year later, the barracks is transformed into a vocational training center. The railway linking Tadmaït to Dellys has been removed.

It is from the early 1970s that the village is experiencing significant changes. A whole neighborhood of colonial houses is shaved to make room for a set of buildings. The college is kept as is and the clinic converted into maternity. At the same time, the destruction of the church that will last several years to build a mosque instead begins.

New cities were created, west of the town from the early 1990s (Cité Ferki), then the 2000s (Cité EPLF), as well as a new high school and schools. A second building similar to the old colonial town hall was built in the early 1990s and currently serves as the headquarters of the APC. New subdivisions are developing to the south and south-east of the town (on the heights of the town).

The building that housed the National Gendarmerie dating from the colonial era was blown up by a car bomb attack in the mid-1990s. The Colonial Town Hall and the Lambert School do not stand up to the 2003 earthquake.

A set of tower buildings was built at the northern entrance of the municipality as part of the 2001-2002 AADL project. A new clinic was inaugurated in 2014 (Clinic Chouhada Merzouk - EPSP DBK).

== Meaning of the name ==
Tadmaït, in Amazigh language mean palm (of the hand), but which can also mean the dwarf palm tree, indeed the chief town of the commune is a floodplain (floods during the years 1970 to 80) where passes the Sebaou. In addition, Tadmaït is surrounded by mountains, which gives it this aspect similar to a palm of hand.

== Education ==
In Tadmaït, there are 11 primary schools, 4 middle schools and one high school. Their names are names of martyrs of the region.

=== Primary Schools ===
Name	Address	Contact
AZZOUZ Said	Village of Bouketchawen	N/A
Amar BAYOU	Rezki Benalia's road, chief-town of the commune	N/A
RAIAH Ali	City of orange trees	N/A
AAOUIN Lounès	lotissement Baghdad	N/A
New school of ABBAS Ahmed	cité 2000 Logements-EPLF, chief-town of the commune	N/A
LAKHDARI Ali	Village of Kaf El Aogab	N/A
BOUAKAZ Lounès	Village of Ichakalen	N/A
BERKANI Mohamed	Village of Ait Ouarezdin	N/A
BOUARABA Mohamed	Village of Ihidoussen	N/A
DJEMAA Amar	Village of Ait Sâada	N/A
Brothers GUECHTOULI	Village of Ait Kharcha, Sidi Ali Bouneb	N/A

=== Middle schools (CEM) ===
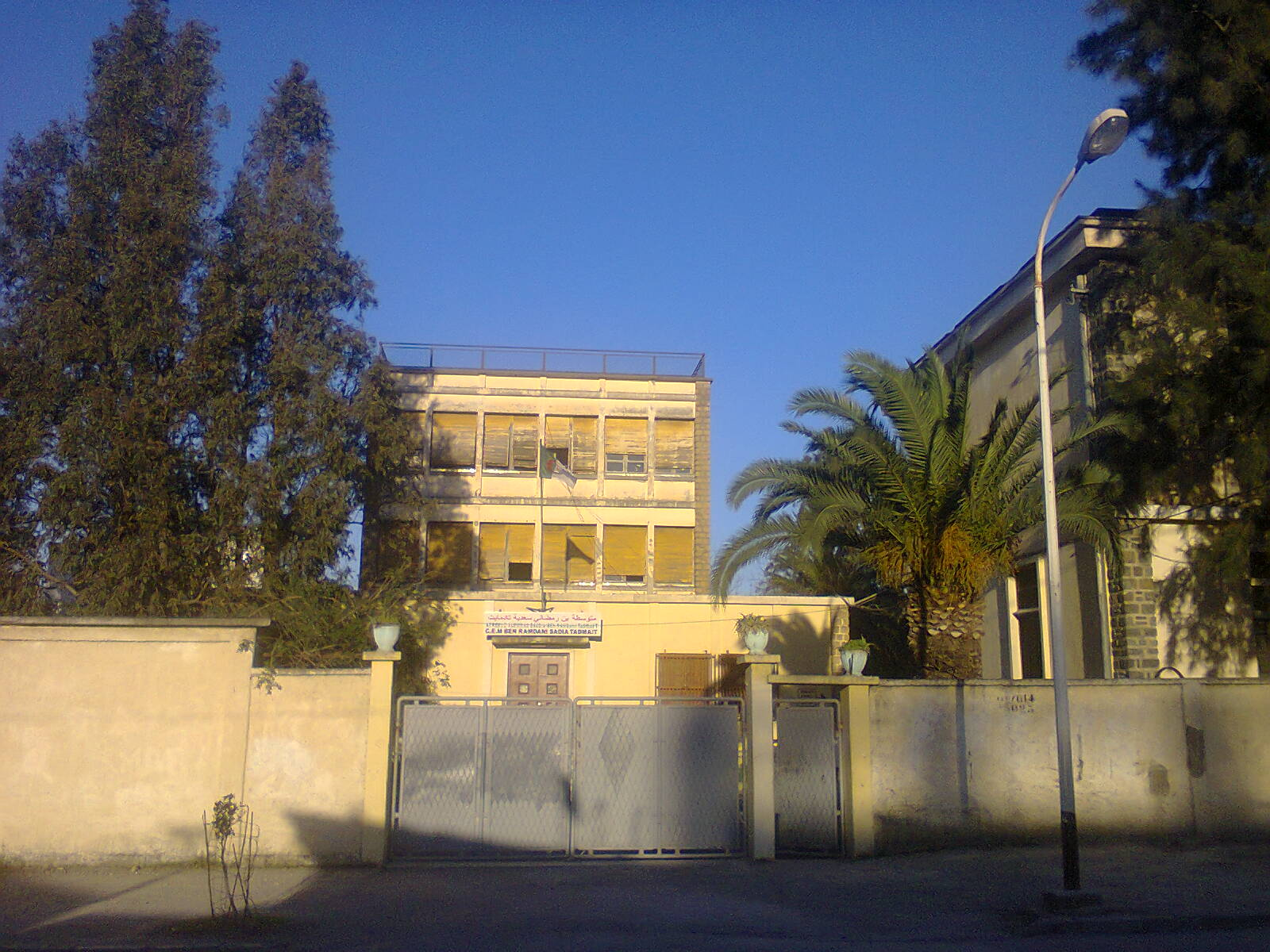
Principal gate of BEN RAMDANI Saâdia's Middle School (previously: Girls Middle School of Jesus-Marie), chief-town of Tadmait

Name	Address	Contact
BEN RAMDANI Saâdia (Previously CEM Girls "Jesus-Marie" on colonial era)	Ali Bennour's Road, chief-town of the commune	N/A
New middle school of Martyrs	Martyrs city, chief-town of the commune	N/A
BOUKHARI M'Hamed	Village of Ait Khercha	N/A
Ferhat BEN SAFI	lotissement Kara Ahmed	N/A
previously CEM Amar BAYOU (CEM Boys on colonial era). It was destroyed as a result of the 2003 earthquake.

=== High School (Secondary School) ===
Name	Address	Contact
Ali BENNOUR and his brothers' High School	Colonel AMIROUCHE's Road, Tadmaït	N/A

== Geography ==
=== Location ===
The commune of Tadmaït is located in the west of Tizi Ouzou. It's bordered:

- On the north by Baghlia (Boumerdès Province)
- On northern east by Sidi Nâamane
- On east by Draâ Ben Khedda
- On southern east by Tirmitine
- On south by Aït Yahia Moussa
- On west by Naciria (Boumerdès Province)

=== Localities of the commune ===
The commune of Tadmait is made up of 21 localities

- Afir
- Agouni Amrouche
- Ait khercha
- Ait Yahia
- Aït Hamou
- Aït Mamar
- Aït Ouarzedine
- Aït Si Amar
- Aït Saada
- I sekayen
- Aït Sidi Smaïl
- Aziv Igherbiène
- Bouzourène ou iazaven
- El Medaï
- Ihidoussen
- Ichakalen
- Igherviyen ufella
- Kaf El Aogab
- Tagueroucht
- Thala Benamane
- Thala Malek
- Tizi Bouadou
- Tleta
- Ait annane
- Tala Malek
- Ait Sidi Smail
- I Khendrichen

== Economy ==
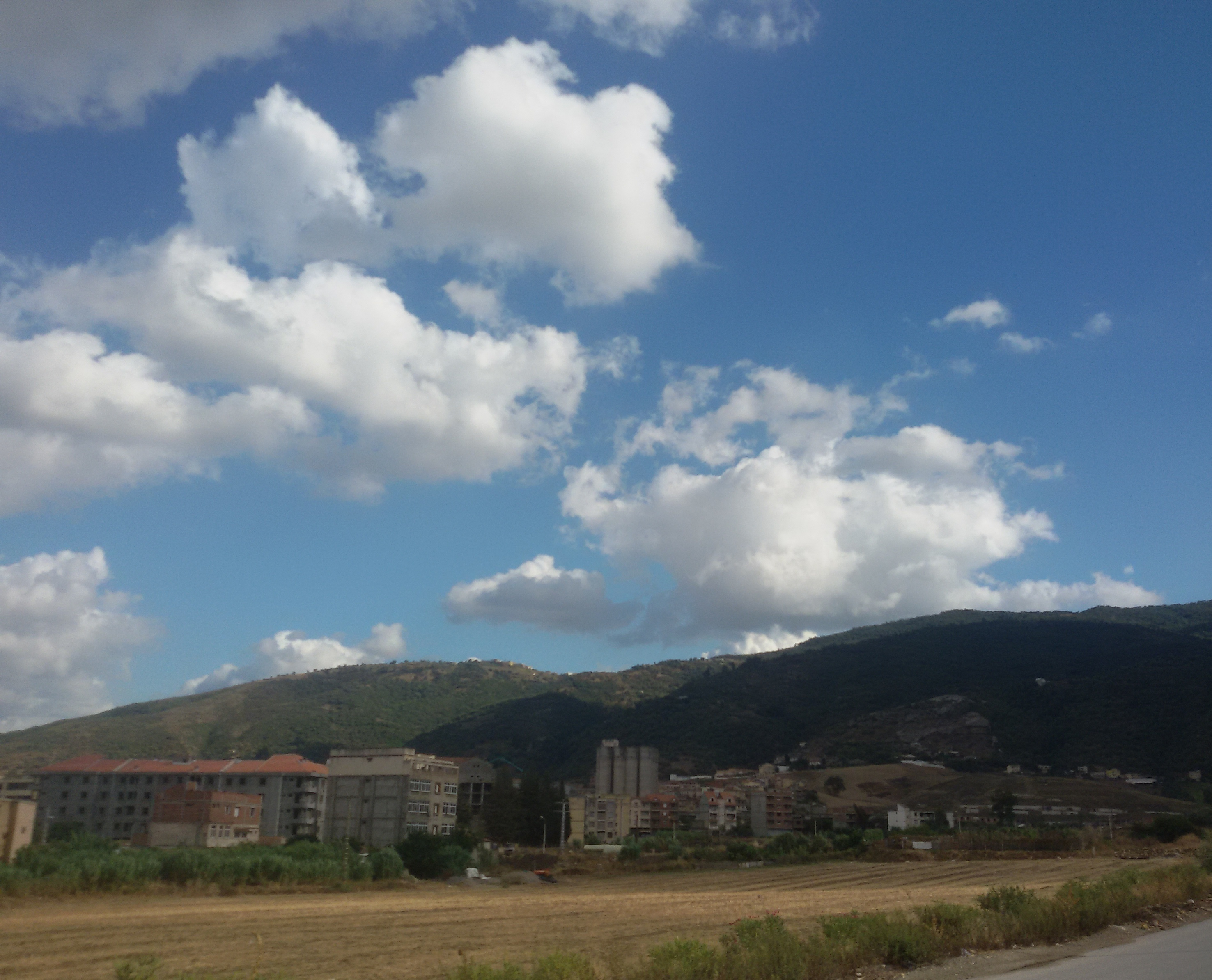
Vue of ERIAD/AGRODIV-Tadmaït (SIMPAC).

The municipality of Tadmaït has no significant economic or industrial infrastructure, apart from

- a mill of AGRODIV group employing about a hundred workers in the early 1970s and currently idling.
- an Economic Activity Zone located in the area said Ajdhayen 2 km south-west of the chief-towninitiated in the 1980s, some SMEs started their activity of manufacturing bolts, processing and packaging olives; the latter is alone in resisting the advent of terrorism that ravaged the fragile economic fabric, insecurity has made Tadmaït a common dying on all fronts.

Before years, there was a regional wholesale market for fruits and vegetables in Tadmaït, but it was recently moved to Tizi Ouzou.

== Professional training ==
Tadmaït has a CFPA professional and administrative training center since independence. It has a teaching capacity of 300 trainees, and a boarding capacity of 130 places; the center offers several types of training according to the levels: storekeeper, masonry, ladies hairstyles, carpentry of buildings, electricity of buildings, accounting, mechanical repair light vehicle, ready-to-wear, sanitary installation and gas, operator in computer science, filming, sculpture on wood.

== Sports ==
The commune of Tadmaït has an artificial grass stadium called Chahid Aiboud Ahcene Stadium.

It has a football team called Jeunesse Sportive de Tadmaït (JST) created in 1968 in black and white, and another in the village of Sidi Ali Bounab named Youth Sports Ali Bounab (JSAB). In 2015, another team called Football Club Tadmait (FCT) in orange and green colors is created. Another football team specialized in youth training exists in the municipality and is called Tadmaït Youth Footballers (JFT).

Other sports are not very developed in the town, like karate where there was for more than 20 years a single small room for all the youth of the town. Athletics, handball and petanque were practiced for a while.

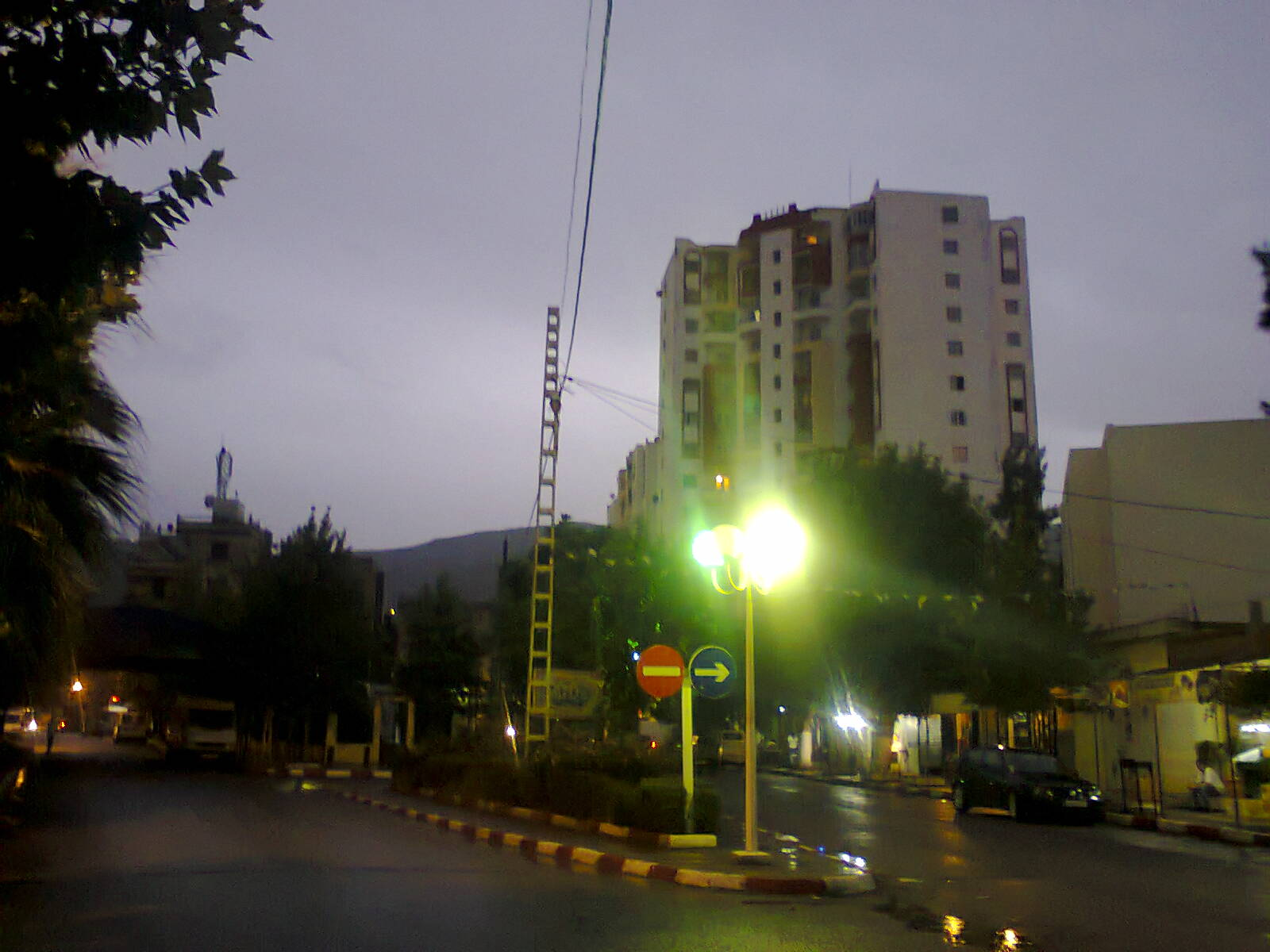
AADL City
