= Naciria District =

Coordinates: 36°44′51″N 3°49′44″E

Naciria District دائرة الناصرية
- District
- Map of Algeria highlighting Boumerdès Province

- Map of Boumerdès Province highlighting Naciria District
- Country: Algeria
- Province: Boumerdès
- District seat: Naciria

Population (1998)
  - Total: 43,664
- Time zone: UTC+01 (CET)
- Municipalities: 2

Naciria is a district in Boumerdès Province, Algeria. It was named after its capital, Naciria.

== Municipalities ==
The district is further divided into 2 municipalities:

- Naciria
- Ouled Aissa

The historic name of Naciria is Laaziv zaamoum, situated in the state of Boumerdes (Algeria).

== History ==
=== French conquest ===
- Expedition of the Col des Beni Aïcha (1837)
- First Battle of the Issers (1837)
- Battle of the Col des Beni Aïcha (1871)

=== Salafist terrorism ===
- 2008 Naciria bombing (2 January 2008)

== Notable people ==
- Mohamed ben Zamoum
- Omar ben Zamoum
