= Imezdaten =

Imezdaten ⵉⵎⴻⵣⴷⴰⵜⴻⵏ مزداتة/Mezdatta
- Village
- Nickname: The Braves
- Location within Algeria
- Coordinates: 36.653176°N 4.005713°E
- Country: Algeria
- Region: Kabylia
- Province: Tizi Ouzou
- Municipality: Tizi Ouzou

Area
  - Land: 237 km^{2} (92 sq mi)
- Elevation: 726 m (2,382 ft)

Population
  - Total: 1,200 (village committee census)
- Time zone: UTC+1 (CET)
- Postal code: 15122

Imezdaten (in Berber : ⵉⵎⴻⵣⴷⴰⵜⴻⵏ) is a village in Kabylia located 15 km (9.3 miles) southwest of Tizi Ouzou in the Betrouna region and municipality of Tizi Ouzou, Algeria.

== Toponymy ==
The name Imezdaten comes from the Berber word Ar zedat meaning "those who go forward" or "The Brave". The name of the village is "Imezdaten" and is Arabized to "Mezdatta" and "M'zidène" by the Arabs. The name was mangled by secretaries of the generals in dispatches and reports during Algeria's period of French colonialism (1830–1962).

== Location ==
Geographically, the village is the last locality of the Municipality of Tizi-Ouzou towards the limits of the region of Maatka, on the national road CW 147. The village is located in a mountain called Ighil Bou Rioul in the tribe of Betrouna. The village of Imezdaten affects three communes at the same time, Tizi ouzou, Maâtkas and Tirmitine. It has the highest elevation among the 22 villages of Betrouna, estimated at 726 m above sea level. It is considered to be one of the main villages in "ibetrunen".

It is surrounded in the north by the villages of Taddart oufella and Ighil Ouberouak, to the west by the municipality of Tirmitine, to the east by the Amejoud Forest, and to the south by the two villages of Igariden and Anegah de la commune of Maatka.

== Transport ==
The village of Mezdatta is crossed to the west by the national road CW 147 which passes through the region of Betrouna towards the Commune of Maatka.

The village has two public transport lines including the line of "Betrouna - Tizi-ouzou" which leads to the village stop (the city) from the "South-West stop" in Tizi-ouzou. The second line is “Maâtkas - Tizi-ouzou” which runs from the stop of annar amellal to the stop of Mezdatta (the city).

The two lines of the village have almost the same distance, 15 km, and the transportation is done by Nissan, Ford and Hyundai vans with 15 seats. It takes about 25 to 35 minutes to reach the village stop and there are several stops in different villages of Betrouna region along the way.

== Nature ==
Imezdaten contains several plants including Olives, Fig trees, Prickly pears, pomegranates, and grapes, and with several genera. In the Amejoud Forest (which occupies a certain area of the village), there are also many plants, including fruit trees such as the Strawberry Tree, the acorns of the Holm Oak, Cork Oaks, Quinces, and many species below such as Allium triquetrum, mushrooms and others.

Plant life occupies a large area of the village, including forests and local farms.

== History ==
On 6 June 1871, Tizi Ouzou's column found Oued-fali impassable and had to wait to cross it until water had subsided. They spent that day in Imezdaten. The difficult climb was cut off by trenches and olive and ash trees.

In the second half of the nineteenth century, the French reached Ath Betrouna, which contains three "toufik". There were several battles, including the battle of Ait khelifa and the battle of Cherif Boubaghla. The conflict resulted in three dead and 21 wounded by the men of imezdaten and ibetrunen. After great resistance and many deaths, the French dominated the tribe of ibetrunen and the village was completely evacuated. The villagers abandoned their shelters and fled, and the village became empty. It was then a locality under French domination.
