= Dar Es-Sultan =

Historical province in Algeria

Dar es-Sultan دار السلطان
- 16th century–1830
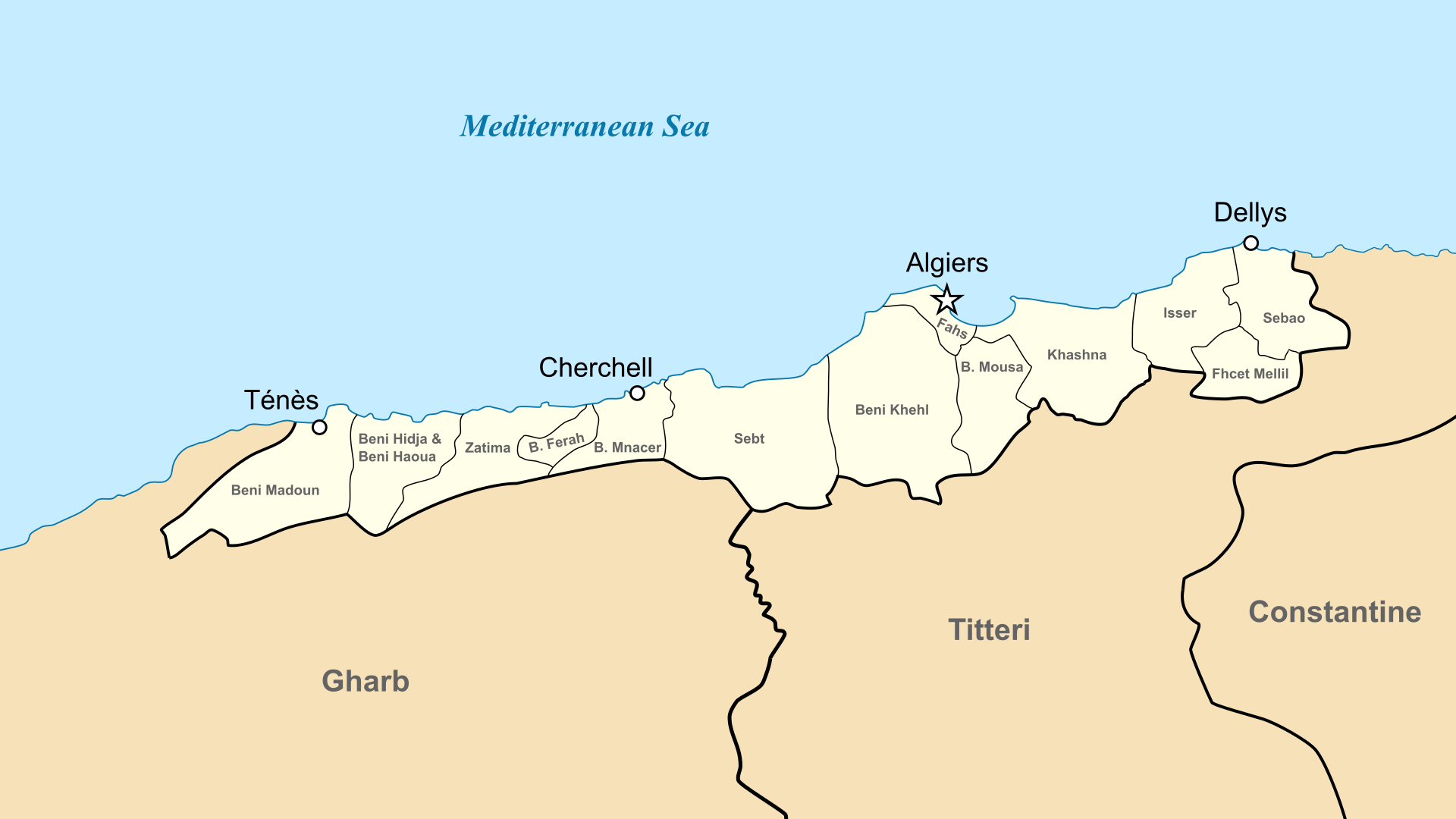
- Map of Dar Es-Sultan, including districts, in the Regency of Algiers.
- Capital: Algiers
- History
  - Established: 16th century
  - Disestablished: 1830
- Today part of: Algeria

Dar Es-Sultan, which can be translated into "Sultan's Domain" - was one of the provinces of the Regency of Algiers. This province was bounded to the north by the Mediterranean Sea, to the east by the Beylik of Constantine, to the south by that of the Beylik of Titteri and to the west by the Western Beylik. Dar Es Sultan included the capital Algiers, the Mitidja plain and the coastline to Tenès.

Transposed on the current territorial divisions, it would consist of the wilayas of Algiers, Tipaza, Blida as well as parts of the wilayas of Chlef, Médéa, Boumerdes and Ain Defla.

== Governance and administration ==
Dar Es-Sultan, was intended to be a territory directly placed under the authority of the Dey of Algiers, while the other beyliks were to be ruled by beys. In reality, the governing of Dar Es-Sultan was occupied by the Agha al-mahalla, chief of the army and second minister of the dey.

== See also ==
- Regency of Algiers
- Beyliks de la Régence d'Alger
- List of governors and rulers of the Regency of Algiers
- Beys de la province du Titteri
- Beylik of Constantine
- Beylik of Titteri
- Beylik of the West

== Bibliography ==
- Kaddache, Mahfoud (1992). L'Algérie durant la période ottomane. Alger: OPU. p. 239. ISBN 978-9961-0-0099-1..
- Baron Juchereau de Saint-Denis : Considérations statistiques, historiques, militaires et politiques sur la régence d'Alger
