= Médéa expedition (1830) =

Military Expedition of Kingdom of France

Atlas expedition of 1830
- Part of the French conquest of Algeria
| Date | 17 November–December 1830 |
| Location | Blida and Médéa, Algeria |
| Result | French victory at Medea: Collapse of the Beylik of Titteri; Algerian victory at Blida: French forced to retreat after Ben Zamoum counter-attacks |

Belligerents
| Kingdom of France | Beylik of Titteri; Ben Zaamoun resistance |

Commanders and leaders
| (France) Bertrand Clausel (France) François Boyer | Boumezrag Bey (surrendered); Ben Zaamoum |

Strength
| 8,000 soldiers | Boumezrag's forces: 6,000 men Ben Zaamoum's forces: Unknown |

Casualties and losses
| Unknown: 127 killed in Ben Zaamoum's counter-attack | Unknown |

The first Médéa expedition, also known as the Atlas expedition of 1830, was a military expedition conducted by the Kingdom of France against the remnants of the Deylik of Algiers, the Beylik of Titteri and the local resistance led by Mohamed ben Zaamoum. It began on 17 November 1830 and ended eight in early December.

== Background ==
In 1830, France invaded the capital of the Deylik of Algiers, and captured the city on July 5. Following the capitulation of Hussein Dey, the French sent letters to the three main regional governors of the Beylik of Oran, Titteri, and Constantine. Mustapha Boumezrag, bey of Titteri, and Ahmed ben Mohamed Chérif, bey of Constantine refused to do so, and thus were soon declared dethroned by the French government in Algiers. Furthermore, Mustapha Boumezrag, along with his ally of necessity, Mohamed ben Zamoum a Kabyle ex-officer of the Deylik declared as leader of Jihad by the local Arab and Berber tribes of Blida and its surroundings were waging war on the French in Algiers.

In response to this de Bourmont, governor of French Algiers decided to send an expedition to defeat ben Zaamoum and the tribes loyal to him. Attacking the city of Blida on the 22nd of July, he was soon forced to turn back and the battle ended in an Algerian victory, the first of its kind since the French landed in Algiers. After the failure of France in the First Battle of Blida against the forces of Mohamed, de Bourmont was relieved of his duties and General Bertrand Clausel was appointed as the governor of Algiers in August. He soon started preparing for a major campaign against the Beylik of Titteri and the local tribes and he prepared more than 8,000 men for this goal. The expedition was launched on 17 November.

== The campaign ==
=== Initial capture of Blida ===
The inhabitants of Blida refused to allow the French army into the city and a fierce battle broke out which left an unknown amount of killed or wounded. The French army burned the orchards surrounding the city and the inhabitants were forced to flee into the mountains. Before his departure from Blida, General Bertrand Clausel left a French garrison under the command of Colonel Roulhières and headed towards Médéa.

=== Battle of Mouzaïa ===
Boumezrag awaited the French troops with about 6,000 men of his own in the Mouzaïa pass. 1,500 Algerian troops were situated on the eastern and western side of the pass. The rest of the troops of the Bey of Tittery were echeloned in the gorge, in front of the main position, occupying the points most favorable to the defense of the pass and some troops, composed of Arab and Berber tribal cavalry were situated near the rear of the French troops.

These defensive positions could only be attacked from the front and from the left, the depth of the cliff which bordered the right of the road not allowing troops to pass on that side.

On November 25, a column composed of 14th, 20th and 28th French line infantry regiments climbed the heights to the east and took the troops of the Bey of Titteri from the rear by surprise.

Several French companies soon engaged in a heavy battle with the troops of the Bey. After a short but lively fight, the position was taken by the French units, and the Algerians, astonished at the vigor of the attack, fled the field. At the end of the day, the French flag flew over the pass. During this fight, the second lieutenant of the 20th regiment, Patrice de Mac Mahon was particularly distinguished.

=== Fall of Médéa, capitulation of Boumezrag ===
While advancing towards Médéa, the French had to repel several minor attacks and skirmishes against them before a poorly dressed man from the city gave the general a letter of submission. Boumezrag fled the city with his family and went into hiding in Kabylia before capitulating to the French a few days later. A new bey would be installed instead of him called Mustapha ben Omar.

=== Ben Zaamoum's counter-attack ===
Despite the initial success, a French contingent was ambushed near Mouzaïa by tribes loyal the Ben Zaamoum, and 27 French soldiers were killed. Before General Clausel returned from Médéa, the Algerians managed to eliminate a French contingent of 100 soldiers near Boufarik on 25 November 1830. Finally on the 26th of November, a large Algerian army commanded by Ben Zaamoum stormed Blida and took over several quarters of the city. After heavy fighting between the armies, the French soon decided to withdraw from the city as according to Clausel the city was not worth the risk.

== See also ==
- Algerian War
- First Battle of Blida
- French Algeria
- French conquest of Algeria
