= Z'har =

- Directed by: Fatma Zohra Zamoun
- Screenplay by: Fatma Zohra Zamoun
- Produced by: Les Films du Cygne
- Starring: Fadila Belkebla, Kader Kada, Eddy Lemar, Fatma Zohra Zamoun, Omar Zamoun, Saliha Ziani, Allel Ziani, Guermia Douaifia, Khlifi El Eulmi, Morad Gourissi
- Cinematography: Benjamin Chartier
- Edited by: Julien Chiaretto
- Music by: Olivier Manganelli, Takfarinas
- Release date: 2009
- Running time: 78'
- Countries: Algeria; France

Z'har (Arabic: زهر) is a 2009 Algerian film directed by Fatma Zohra Zamoum.

== Synopsis ==
1997: Alia is a Parisian photographer, travelling from Tunis to Constantine (Algiers) to see her sick father. Cherif is a writer and has just read, according to the newspapers, that he's dead. Their driver is a cab driver used to doing the Tunis-Constantine route. 2007: Fatma Zohra asks her brother to go with her on a location scout. The film is dear to her heart because it portrays the violence that swept Algiers during the nineties. The crew starts out on a two thousand kilometre journey that leads to a hypothetical fiction or the dream of one during which the main characters get to know one another. But the project can't find financing. How does one carry out a fiction when all is against you?

== Awards ==
- International Film Festival of Kerala (India)
- Pune International Film Festival (India)
- Famafest (Portugal)
- Festival Cinema Africano
- AsI
- America Latina de Milano (Italia)
- Festival Indie Lisboa (Portugal)
