= First Battle of Blida =

First Expedition of Blida
- Part of French conquest of Algeria
Date	22–24 July 1830
Location	Blida, Algeria
Result	Algerian victory

Belligerents
Kingdom of France	Beylik of Titteri; Iflissen Oumellil confederation Beni Salah tribe Beni Misra tribe

Commanders and leaders
Louis Auguste Victor de Bourmont	Mohamed ben Zamoum

Strength
1,500 soldiers 4 cannons 150 chasseurs	5,000

Casualties and losses
15 killed 43 wounded	200 killed (French claim); Low (Algerian claim)

The First Expedition of Blida took place from 22 to 24 July 1830, during the French conquest of Algeria.

== The Expedition ==
On 22 July 1830, Marshal de Bourmont organized a reconnaissance expedition on the city of Blida. On the early morning of 23 July, the French force consisting of 1,500 men and a squadron of 150 chasseurs departed from Algiers. The French reached the city at around 5:00 pm and were welcomed by locals who offered them fruits and drinks. Marshal de Bourmont installed himself in a large house bordered by a luxurious garden of orange trees not far from the city gates, while the troops made camp in the garden and the nearby cemetery.

The night was quiet, but around 10:00 am on 24 July, a returning French party that had gone on a reconnaissance mission in the nearby gorge earlier in the morning was fired at from bushes and two French soldiers were wounded. General Desprez took six chasseurs and went about a mile up the river where he saw many armed men on the mountain. Although they merely observed the small French party without attacking, d’Esprez chose to head back to the city rather than go any further. Marshal de Bourmont decided it would be wiser to return to Algiers and ordered troops to get ready to depart at 1:00 pm.

Two French artillerymen who had brought their horses to drink in a stream at the foot of the mountain were surprised and beheaded by kabyle warriors. At around midday, a firefight broke out in the city and baron Alphonse Blouquier de Trélan, Marshal de Bourmont's aide-de-camp, was mortally wounded after receiving a bullet in the lower abdomen. The French rapidly gathered in column formation and started marching back toward Algiers as thousands of kabyle warriors came down from mountain, soon joined by some inhabitants of Blida.

The French column marched at regular pace, stopping occasionally to allow their artillery to fire into their pursuers. From 2:00 pm until the end of the day, the Algerians followed the French across the Mitidja plain, always kept at bay by the chasseurs on the flanks. Whenever they would get too close, French cavalry would charge to drive them away. The Prince of Schwarzenberg notably slayed two kabyle warriors with his sword.

The last action of the day took place in a small oleanders grove North-East from Boufarik, after which the Algerian forces withdrew as night fell. After a one-hour resting halt, the French column resumed marching toward Algiers and reached Birtouta around 11:00 pm. They spent the night in the town, where de Bourmont officially received his marshal baton from the hands of Viscount de Bois-le-Comte who had arrived from France earlier during the day. No fighting occurred on the next day and the French column reached Algiers by 1:00 pm on 25 July. The French troops withdrew in an orderly manner.

== Aftermath ==
The fleeing of the French troops from Blida bolstered popular support for resistance against the French invaders. This was the first victory achieved by the Algerians since the French army landed at Sidi Fredj.

== See also ==
- Algeria
- Algerian War
- Second Battle of Blida
- Expédition de Larbaâ (1837)
