= Fatma Zohra Zamoum =

Algerian writer, filmmaker (born 1967)

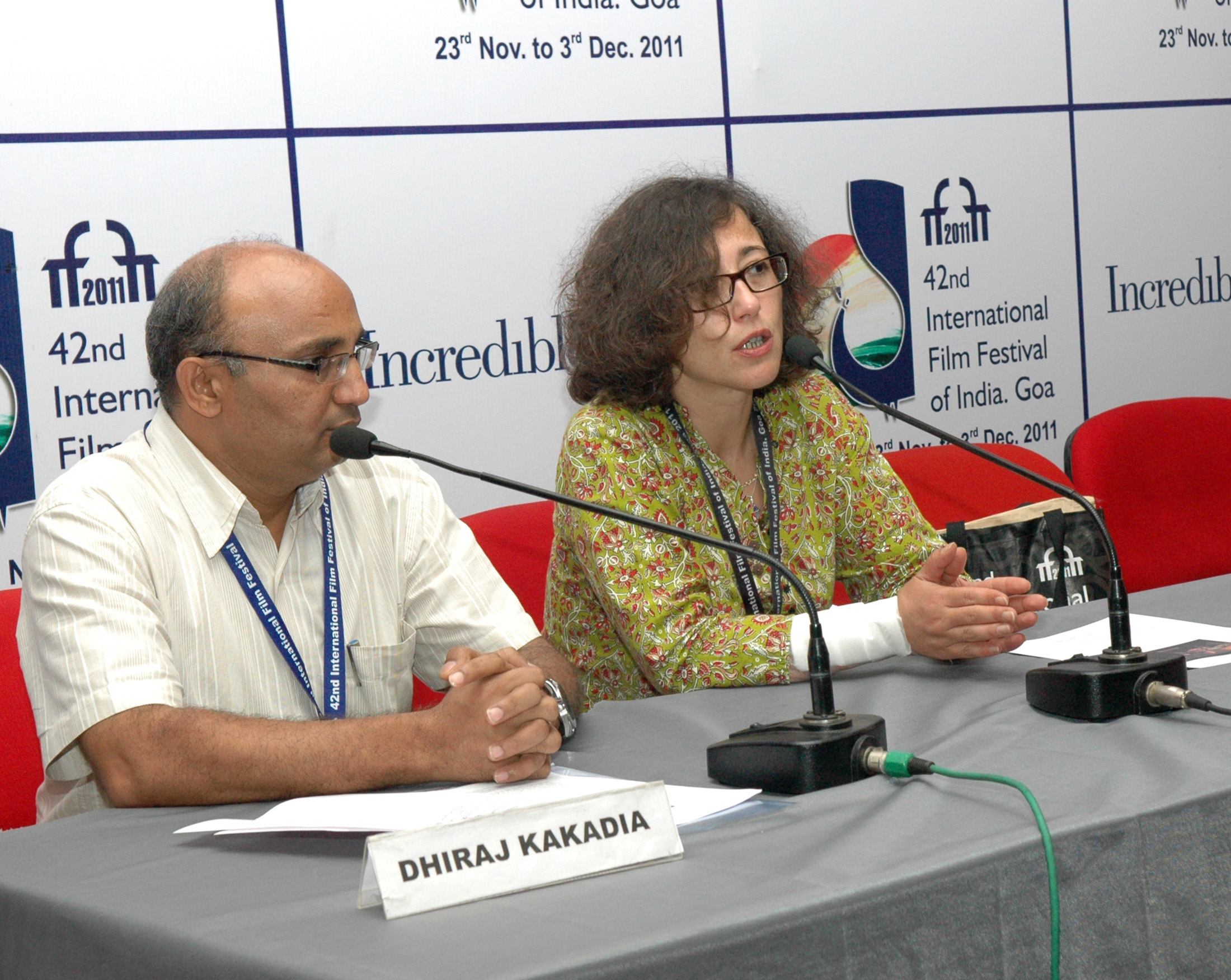
- Fatma Zohra Zamoum, IFFI (2011)
- Born: 19 January 1967 (age 59); Bordj Menaïel, north of Algeria
- Education: Cinematography and Audiovisual studies
- Occupations: Writer, filmmaker, educator

Fatma Zohra Zamoum (Kabyle: Faḍma Zuhra Zamum; born 19 January 1967) is a Franco-Algerian writer, filmmaker and educator.

== Biography ==
Zamoun was born in Bordj Menaïel in the north of Algeria, within a well-known family whose ancestors are Omar ben Zamoum and Mohamed ben Zamoum. After attending the Fine Arts School in Algiers (1985–1988), she went to Paris where she graduated in Cinematography and Audiovisual Studies from the Sorbonne in 1995. She divides her time between Algiers and Paris, pursuing her principal interests, painting, fiction and the cinema.

Z'har (2009) is Zamoun's first feature film, depicting scenes from the violence Algiers experienced in the 1990s. In 2005, she directed the short fiction film La Pelote de Laine and has also authored several books including Comment j'ai fumé tous mes livres (2006). In 2011, she directed and produced a second feature film Kedach Ethabni (Combien tu m'aimes) which tells the story of how little Adel copes with a period spent with his grandmother after his parents break up. She directed and produced since then "Azib Zamoum, A story About Land", in 2014 And in 2019, she achieved a low budget fiction film named PARKOUR(S) and an unreleased documentary: Body + Art.

== Works ==
- 1995: Photos de voyages, documentary
- 1996: Leçon de choses, documentary
- 1999: À tous ceux qui partent, novel
- 2003: Le Vingtième Siècle dans la peinture algérienne, historical work and expertise
- 2004: La Maison de Roy Azdak, documentary
- 2005: La Pelote de laine, documentary
- 2006: Comment j'ai fumé tous mes livres, novel
- 2009: Z'har (Un)Lucky, experimental film
- 2009: Le Docker noir, documentary
- 2012: Kedach Ethabni or How Big Is Your Love, feature film
- 2014 : "Azib Zamoum, A story About Land", docu drama for Tv and cinema
- 2019 : "PARKOUR(S), a feature length fiction
- 2019 : BODY + ART, a documentary feature length

== See also ==
- Omar ben Zamoum
- Mohamed ben Zamoum
