= Sidi Ali Bounab =

Mountain in Algeria

Sidi Ali Bounab is a mountain in Algeria, about 800 m in height, shared between the wilayas of Tizi Ouzou and Boumerdes. It overlooks the plain of Tadmaït. Its forests are composed mainly of cork oak.

== History ==
During the French conquest of Algeria the area saw intense combat, including the Battle of Tadmaït.

In 1949 it was the scene of a "punitive expedition" by French gendarmes against the villages of the mountain.
