= 2008 Naciria bombing =

Car bomb Terrorist Attack on 2 January 2008 in Naciria

Coordinates: 36.747973°N 3.8306782°E

- Boumerdès Province highlighted within Algeria
- Location: (Algeria) Naciria, Boumerdès Province
- Date: January 2, 2008
- Attack type: Bomb
- Deaths: 4
- Injuries: 20
- Perpetrator: Al-Qaeda Organization in the Islamic Maghreb (suspected)

The 2008 Naciria bombing occurred on January 2, 2008 when a bomb detonated into the headquarters of the Algerian police in the town of Naciria, Boumerdès Province, Algeria killing 4 and injuring 20. The Al-Qaeda Organization in the Islamic Maghreb is suspected as being responsible.

== See also ==
- Terrorist bombings in Algeria
- List of terrorist incidents, 2008
