= Omar ben Zamoum =

Algerian resistant against French conquest of Algeria

- Born: Omar ben Zamoum; 1836; Naciria, Kabylia, Algeria
- Died: 1898 (aged 61–62); Naciria, Kabylia, Algeria
- Military career
- Branch: Iflissen Umellil
- Rank: Khalifa
- Conflicts: Mokrani Revolt: Battle of Alma; Battle of the Col des Beni Aïcha

Omar ben Zamoum (born in Naciria on 1836 and died also in Naciria on 1898) was a Kabyle marabout who participated to the Algerian resistance during Mokrani Revolt against the French conquest of Algeria.

== Family ==
Omar ben Zamoum was born during the year 1836 in the region of Naciria in the Kabyle tribe of Ait Amran as part of the Sanhaja Berber Iflissen Umellil confederacy.

He is the son of Mohamed ben Zamoum who was the commander of the resistance against the French invasion in Mitidja and Kabylia from 1830 until his death in 1843.

His older brother Hocine ben Zamoum was killed in 1836 near Oued El Harrach in a fight against French troupes coloniales.

His granddaughter Fatma Zohra Zamoum is a writer, cinematographer and teacher who was born in Bordj Menaïel within Algeria in January 1967.

== Khalifa of Flissas ==
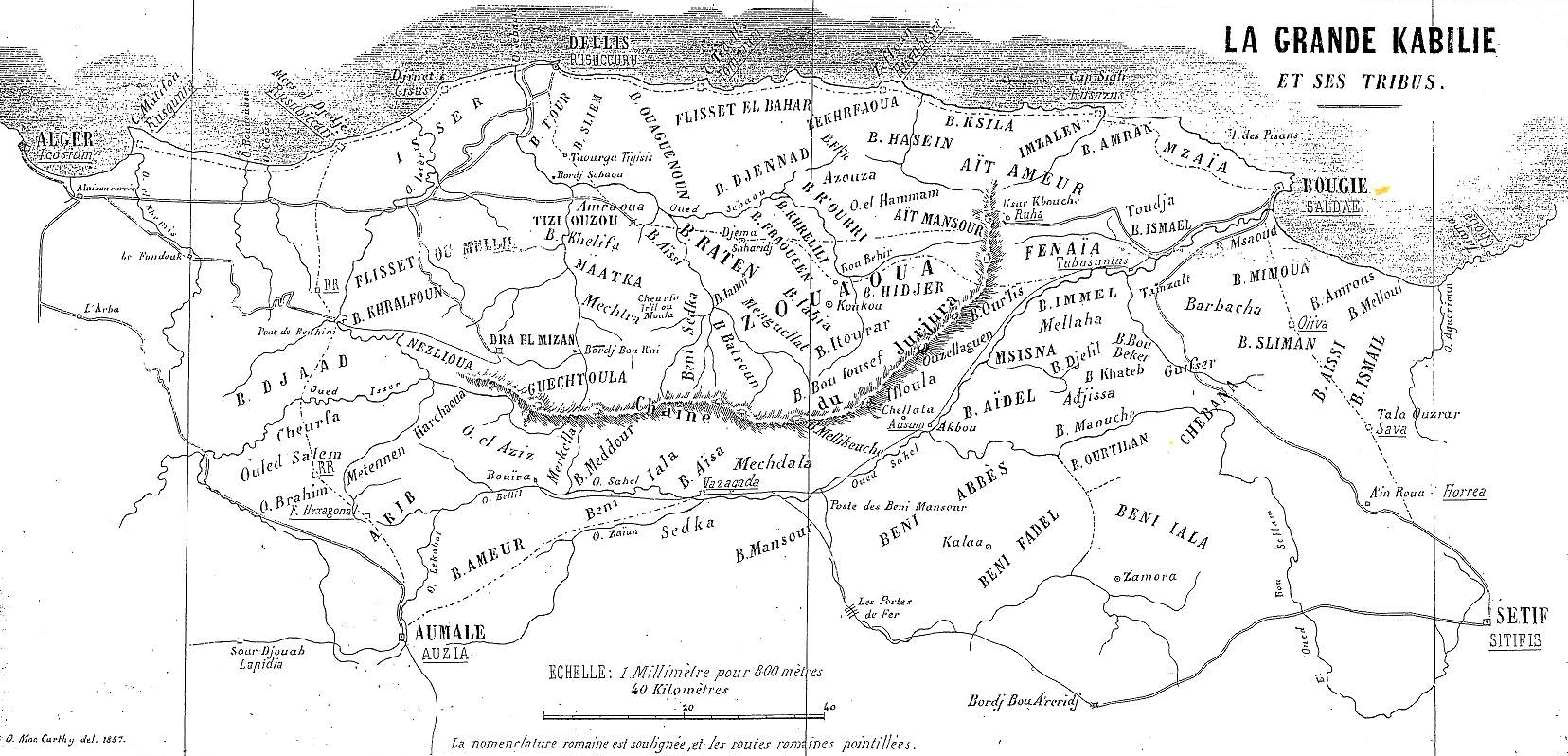
Kabylia

Omar ben Zamoum was appointed in September 1848 by Governor General Viala Charon (1794–1880) as Khalifa of the Iflissen Umellil confederation under the orders of the Agha named Mohamed ben Zitouni, issued from the Ait Mekla tribe.

Indeed, the named Ali Ben Zamoum, nephew of Omar ben Zamoum, was until then Agha des Flissas under French colonial authority since May 1844 despite his young age, but the climate of insecurity that reigned in the region quickly made relieve him of his duties.

Ali ben Zamoum was then arrested and imprisoned for six months in the prison of the Casbah of Algiers, before being interned in Cherchell prison. In 1849, Ali was sent as an exiled convict to the Île Sainte-Marguerite where he remained four years, then he was then authorized in 1853 to settle in Egypt. It was not until 1868, after twenty years of exile far from Kabylia, that he obtained permission to be interned in the prison of Algiers.

== Agricultural property ==
Omar ben Zamoum acquired land near the village of Chender with an area of a few hundred hectares in 1854, where he had a mill built there in 1855 to crush and grind the grains of cereals cultivated by the Kabyles of the surrounding region.

== Mokrani Revolt ==
Omar ben Zamoum had a key role during the Mokrani Revolt in 1871 in the valley of the two rivers of Oued Isser and Oued Sebaou.

As one of the main leaders of the insurrection, along with Cheikh Boumerdassi and Cheikh Boushaki, Omar ben Zamoun participated in the command of the Battle of the Col des Beni Aïcha (1871) and the Battle of Boudouaou (1871).

These marabouts convinced the Kabyle to rise up, and led and organized the rebels by providing them with ammunition, and then ordered the burning of the colonial center of Corso.

But after the military column of General Orphis Léon Lallemand made its counter-offensive and arrived at the French caravanserai near Naciria on 10 May 1871, Omar ben Zamoum introduced him to the 30 French settlers he had saved from extermination.

== Capture and Judgment ==
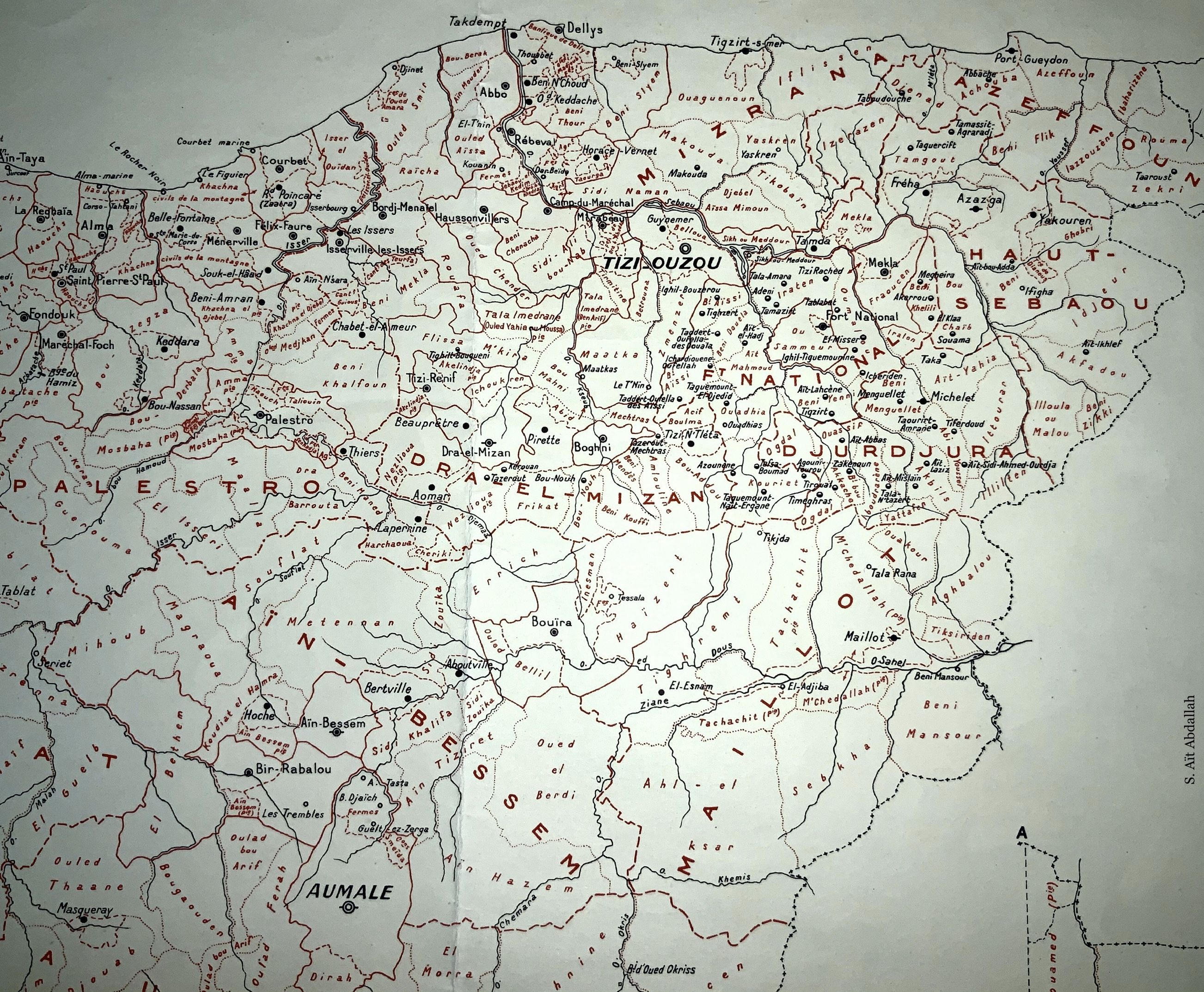
Igawawen tribes of Kabylia.

Upon his capture after the defeat of the Kabyle insurgents in May 1871, Omar ben Zamoum denied certain established facts with which he was accused, and he claimed that he had saved a number of French settlers in Naciria.

Omar was imprisoned in Algiers for a year before his judgment with Cheikh Boumerdassi and Cheikh Boushaki on 1872.

Indeed, the epilogue of this insurrection of 1871 was the conviction of Omar ben Zamoum by the Assize Court of Algiers on 21 January 1872.

Omar was sentenced along with 44 Kabyle ringleaders, 8 of them were sentenced to death, 23 were sentenced to deportation to the pacific, 12 to five years of detention and only one to seven years of imprisonment. Only three of these convicts were executed, the caïd of Ammals named El Hadj Ahmed ben Dahman, Boudjena ben Ahmed, servant of Mr. Bassetti, and one named Sliman ben Ahmed.

== Land expropriation ==
Omar ben Zamoum suffered in 1871, immediately after the suffocation of the revolt in Kabylia, from his fall under the requisition and forced plunder of his land in the region of Chender.

Indeed, more than 2,000 hectares of arable land were sequestered from their Kabyle owners by an act of dispossession issued by the colonial state authority.

The French could not find a location in the middle of the land of the looted insurgents, and this is how some owners including Omar ben Zamoum kept some areas of land near their villages (douars), and benefited from inherited ancestral rights.

Omar narrowly escaped the total sequestration inflicted on those of his tribe around present-day Naciria, and his vast agricultural estate was landlocked in the territory granted to the Society for the Protection of Alsatians and Lorrainers deported after annexation (Arabic: Société de protection des Alsaciens et des Lorrains déportés après l'annexion) on 1870.

There was then a consent from Omar to give up a hundred hectares of his property, and in return receive in exchange an equivalent amount of land in another location not far from Chender.

Omar wanted to keep at all costs the old farm of his ancestors with a substantial lot of surrounding land, and he wrote a long letter on this subject to comte d'Haussonville, in which he set out in oriental style his rights and his request.

The French reluctance was due to the controversy over the presence of a Kabyle established in the midst of new French colonists who came by force of arms and belligerence.

The holders of the colonial power had suspicions and doubts about the Algerians of the surroundings who were going to settle in the area spared the Zamoum to seek to live for their people and their cattle.

A conflict over the availability of vital resources for both the Algerians and the French could emerge at the expense of the growing needs of expatriate settlers, and this imminent source of discussion and danger had to be spared for the future.

The French then resigned themselves not to completely expropriate the Omar farm which was not far from the site of the village of Chender, and to leave him consequently only a lot of land which hardly exceeds the capacity of one hectare, which amounts to an area of a garden and a vegetable patch.

It was then decided and agreed that Omar ben Zamoum will never have any right of course or pasture for his herds on the lands of French settlers and on communal properties.

Omar then deployed all the means in his possession to prevent this expropriation, and sent correspondence to the colonial administration between 1871 and 1875 to denounce the mechanisms of the expropriation of Algerians by French colonization to allow settlers and farmers brought back from Alsace-Lorraine to settle on these despoiled land.

== Death ==
Omar ben Zamoum died in 1898 in Naciria at the age of 62 where he was buried in a cemetery near the village of Chender.

== Filmography ==
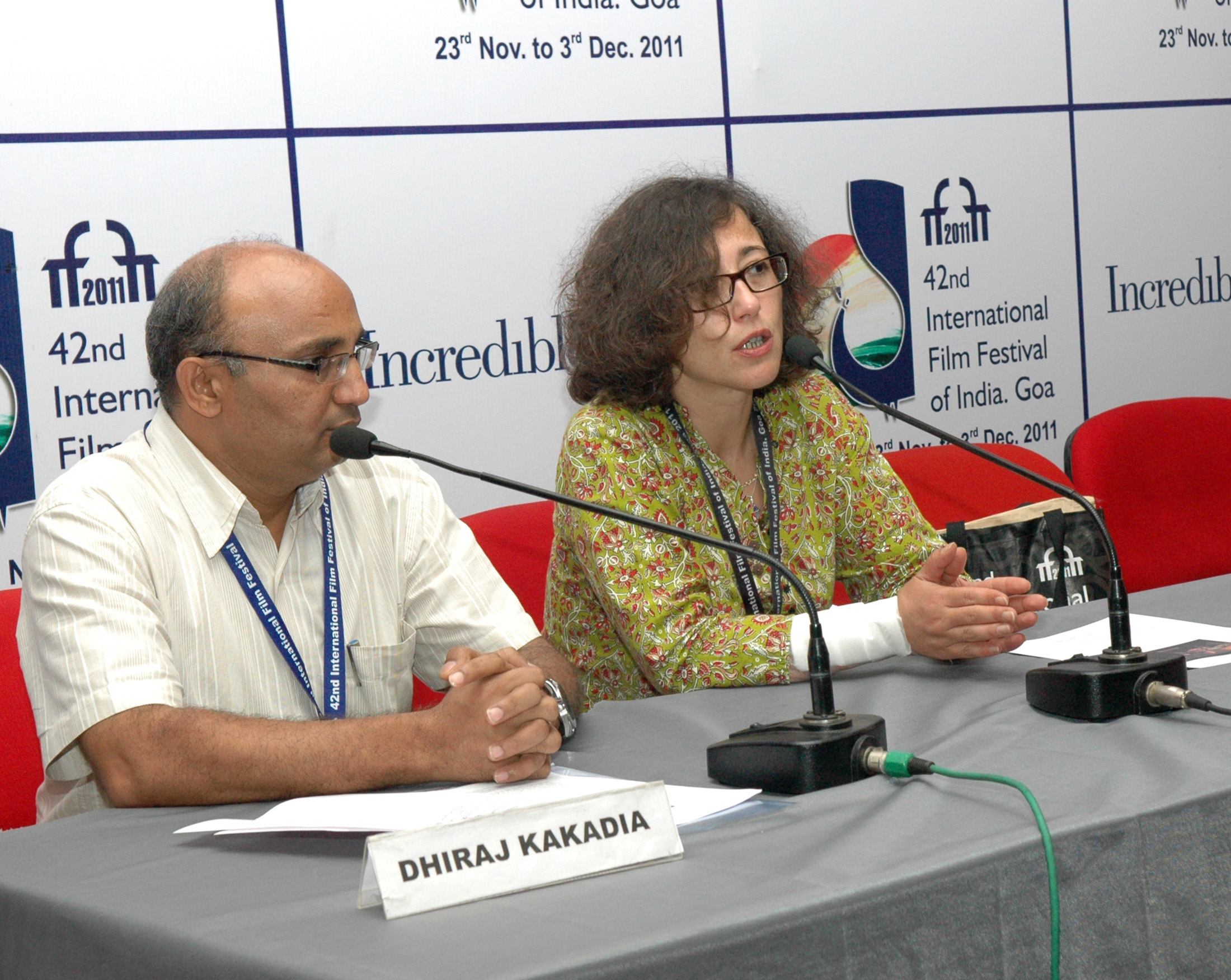
Fatma Zohra Zamoum (to the right)

Film director Fatma Zohra Zamoum (born 1967) made a 72-minute film in 2015 on the saga of her grandfather Omar ben Zamoum to preserve the lands of her ancestors from French colonial plunder in lower Kabylia.

This film was released in theaters in Algeria during the month of May 2015, and this as part of the festivities of the 50th Anniversary of the recovery of Algerian sovereignty and national independence.

This documentary film was produced with the support of distribution by the Algerian Center for Cinematographic Development (CADC) and the Algerian Ministry of Culture.

The company Z and Compagnie Productions in collaboration with Algerian television (EPTV) completed in 2014 the production of this documentary in several languages, Arabic, Kabyle and French, and the subtitling was included in English.

The different versions of this artistic and historical work have been in color and black & white, and is also available in English.

Fatma Zohra Zamoum wrote the screenplay for this film and directed it, and the main actors were Hamid Amirouche, Hacène Benzerari, Hamid Tadjadit and Abdelaziz Zeghbib.

== See also ==
- French conquest of Algeria
- Mohamed ben Zamoum
- Mokrani Revolt
- Battle of the Col des Beni Aïcha (1871)
- Battle of Boudouaou (1871)
- Gabriel Paul Othenin de Cléron, comte d'Haussonville
