= Tirmitine =

- Commune and town
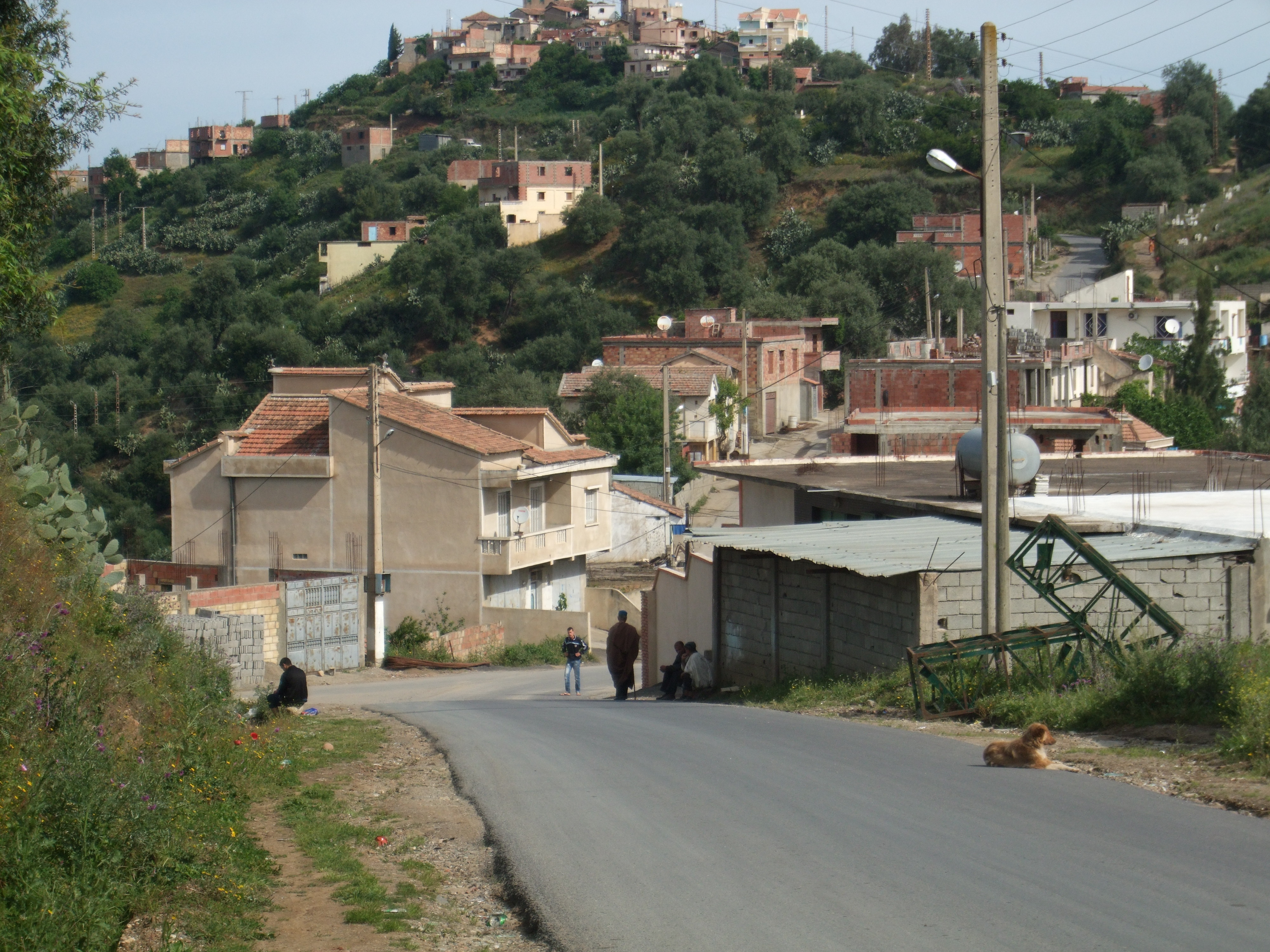

- Location of Tirmitinein the Algeria
- Coordinates: 36°39′42.51″N 3°59′5.2″E
- Country: Algeria
- Province: Tizi Ouzou Province
- District: Draâ Ben Khedda District
- Time zone: UTC+1 (CET)

Tirmitine is a town and commune in Tizi Ouzou Province in northern Algeria.
