= Naciria =

Naciria الناصرية
- Commune and town
- Nickname: ar

- Location within Algeria
- Coordinates: 36.7475°N 3.828889°E
- Country: Algeria
- Province: Boumerdès Province

Population (2008)
  - Total: 22,431
- Time zone: UTC+1 (CET)

For the Sufi order of Tamegroute, Morocco see Nasiriyya.

Naciria (Arabic الناصرية, Kabyle Leɛzib n Zeɛmum) is a town and commune in Boumerdès Province, Algeria, between Bordj Menaïel to the north and the mountain of Sidi Ali Bounab to the south. According to the 1998 census it has a population of 21,272.

== Presentation ==
In the early 18th century, the area was known as Azib Zaamoum / Leɛzib n Zeɛmum ("Zaamoum's farm"), after the Ben-Zaamoum family, leaders of the Iflisen Umellil. In 1873, the French government confiscated 2725 hectares of land from the Ouled Chender, Beni Chenacha, and Kobba Sidi Slimane in the wake of the Mokrani Revolt in order to set up a colony there. This land was given to the Société de protection des Alsaciens-Lorrains to be allocated to Alsatians unwilling to live under German rule following the Franco-Prussian War. The resulting town was given the name of Haussonvillers, after Joseph d'Haussonville, president of the society in question. After Algeria's independence in 1962, the town was renamed Naciria, after a locally born ALN fighter nicknamed "Si Nacer"; nevertheless, it is still unofficially widely known as Laazib.

== History ==
=== French conquest ===
- Expedition of the Col des Beni Aïcha (1837)
- First Battle of the Issers (1837)
- Battle of the Col des Beni Aïcha (1871)

=== Salafist terrorism ===
- 2008 Naciria bombing (2 January 2008)

== Notable people ==
- Mohamed ben Zamoum
- Omar ben Zamoum
