= Mohamed ben Zamoum =

Algerian resistant against French conquest of Algeria

- Born: Mohamed ben Zamoum; 1795; Laazib Nzamoum, Kabylie
- Died: 1843 (aged 47–48); Naciria, Kabylie
- Children: Hocine ben Zamoum; Omar ben Zamoum
- Military career
- Branch: Sanhaja
- Rank: Marabout
- Conflicts: French conquest of Algeria: First Battle of Blida; Second Battle of Blida; Raid on Reghaïa (1837); Expedition of the Col des Beni Aïcha (1837); First Battle of Boudouaou (1837); First Battle of the Issers (1837)

Mohamed ben Zamoum (born in Naciria (Laazib Nzamoum) in 1795 and died in the same city in 1843) was a Kabyle marabout and tribal chief who participated in the Algerian resistance against the French conquest of Algeria.

== Family ==
Mohamed ben Zamoum was born in 1795 in Naciria region into the Kabyle Iflissen Umellil confederacy.

He was part of the noble family of Ben Zamoum who reigned over the confederation of Iflissen Umellil.

Mohamed had several children, the best known of which are Hocine ben Zamoum and Omar ben Zamoum who succeeded him in 1848 in command of the Iflissen Umellil confederation.

His grandson Ali ben Zamoum also played a major role in the Kabyle resistance against French troupes coloniales, from 1844 to 1848.

== French conquest of Algeria ==
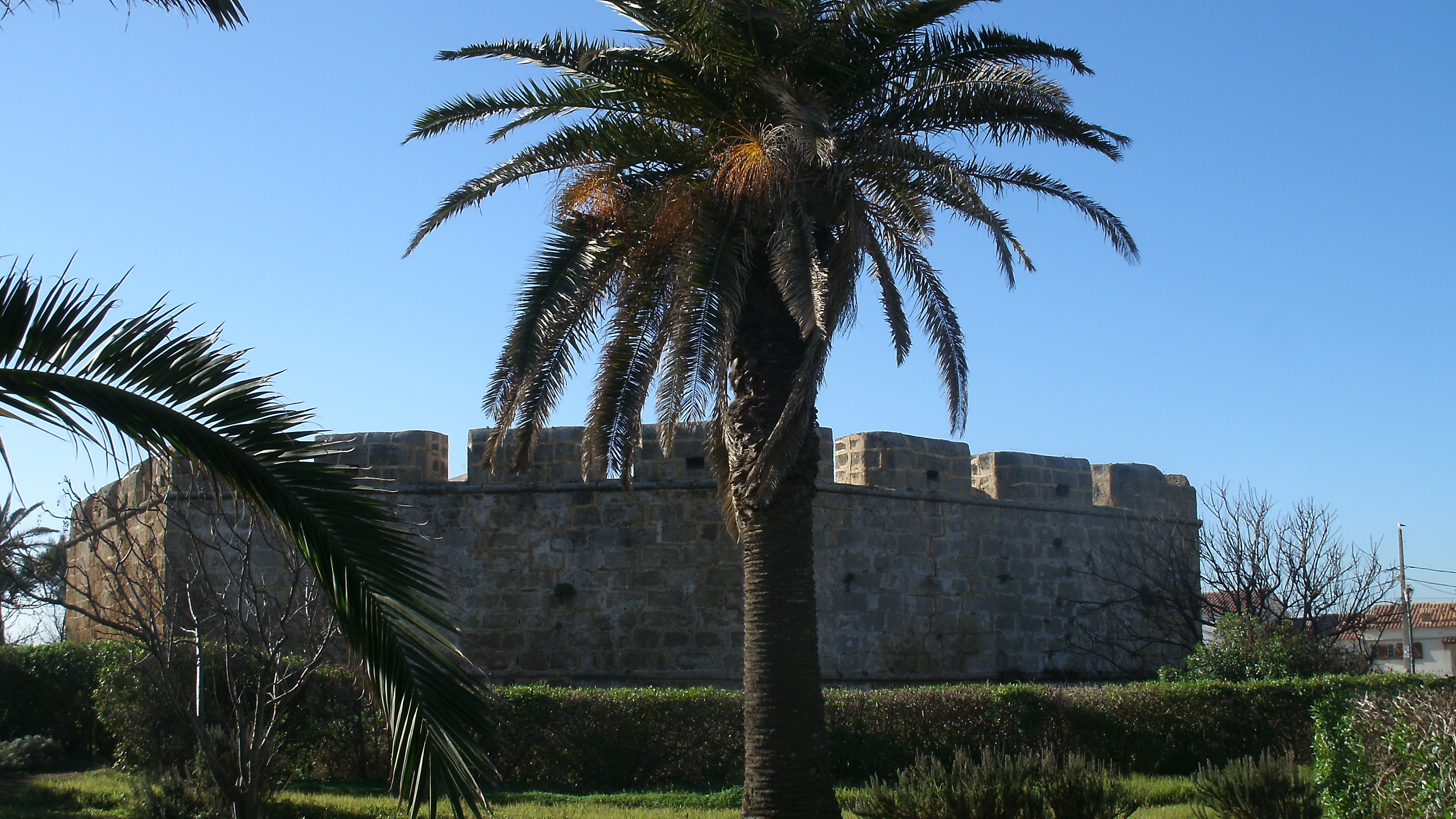
Bordj Tamentfoust

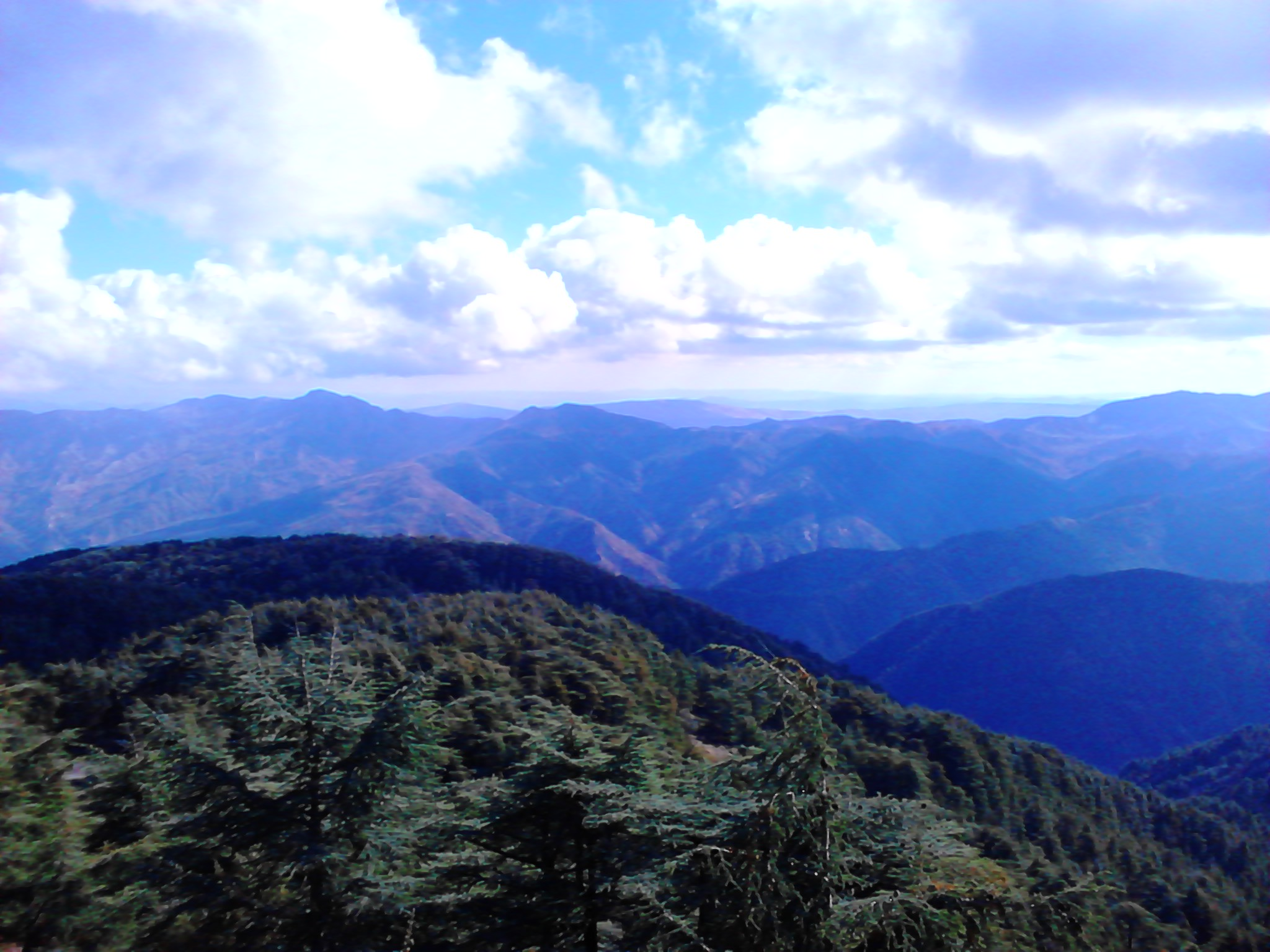
Chréa mountains.

Just after the surrender of Dey Hussein on 5 July 1830 and the capitulation of the Casbah of Algiers, Sheikh Mohamed ben Zamoum, leader of the Iflissen Umellil confederation, organized with the tribal chiefs of Kabylia and Mitidja (Especially the Ait Masra and the Ait Salah) a meeting in the Bordj Tamentfoust. As a result of this meeting, which began on 23 July and ended on 26 July, the leaders decided to resist the French presence and joined their forces and mobilized to join the popular response after the fall of Algiers.

This meeting occurred when General Victor de Bourmont did not follow the advice of Mohamed ben Zamoum in the letter he had addressed to him to dissuade him from initiating a military expedition of the First Battle of Blida.

Nevertheless, de Bourmont began his campaign against Blida on 23 July after having contracted a connivance with the bey of Titteri in Médéa, the named Mustapha Boumezrag.

The defeat of the 1,200 infantry, 100 cavalry, and artillery pieces on which General de Bourmont had based in his expedition against Blida and its surroundings, had convinced Sheikh ben Zamoum that resistance against the French was possible and that the combat would settle the positions of the belligerents.

== Allegiance to Ben Zamoum ==
The tribes of Mitidja and Kabylia then signed a treaty of allegiance to Sheikh ben Zamoum dated 26 July 1830, where he was proclaimed leader of the popular resistance against the forces of the French Army.

Thus, from 2 September 1830, the Sheikh stepped up his raids against the French forces commanded by the new arriving General Bertrand Clauzel, who had been appointed commander-in-chief of the expedition army to replace de Bourmont.

== Second Battle of Blida ==
When on 18 November 1830, a second column of 7,000 French soldiers invaded the town of Blida, they found it almost deserted because most of the population had fled to the mountain of Chréa on the injunction of Sheikh ben Zamoum.

But while the column of Colonel Rulhière was marching on Médéa after taking possession of Blida, the Sheikh sent a contingent of Kabyles from the Flissas tribe under the leadership of his son Hocine ben Zamoum to hook the French in Mitidja.

Having learned of the occupation of Blida by the French soldiers, Hocine ben Zamoum called on Kabyle reinforcements from the Khachna, the Col des Beni Aïcha, the Beni Moussa and the Beni Misra to march against the city of Blida in order to liberate it.

== Death ==
Mohamed ben Zamoum in 1843 in the Naciria region, specifically in Kabylia at the age of 48 after thirteen years of resistance against the French conquest of Algeria.

== See also ==
- French conquest of Algeria
- Ottoman Algeria
- Invasion of Algiers in 1830
- First Battle of Blida (1830)
- Raid on Reghaïa (1837)
- Expedition of the Col des Beni Aïcha (1837)
- First Battle of Boudouaou (1837)
- First Battle of the Issers (1837)
- First Assault of Dellys (1837)
