= Ouaguenoune District =

Coordinates: 36.7700°N 4.1747°E

Ouaguenoun is a district in Algeria. It is located east of Tizi Ouzou. Its central town is Tikobain. Villages in Ouaguenoune include Ighil Bouchene.

The district is further divided into 3 municipalities:

- Ath Aissa Mimoun
- Ouaguenoun
- Timizart
