= Ath Aissa Mimoun =

Aït Aissa Mimoun Ath Aissa Mimoun / آيت عيسى ميمون
- Commune and town
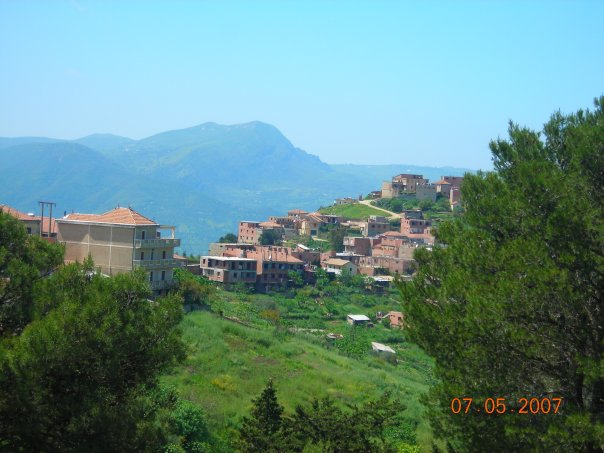
- View of Akaoudj

- Location in Tizi Ouzou Province

- Location within Algeria
- Coordinates: 36.7602°N 4.1365°E
- Country: Algeria
- Province: Tizi Ouzou
- District: Ouaguenoun

Area
  - Total: 14.0 sq mi (36.3 km^{2})
- Elevation: 2,628 ft (801 m)

Population (2008)
  - Total: 20,268
- Time zone: UTC+1 (CET)
- Postal code: 15640

Aït Aissa Mimoune, Kabyle name Ath Aissa Mimoune, known formerly Djebel Aïssa Mimoun, is a commune (borough) in the District of Ouaguenoun, Tizi Ouzou Province, Kabylie region, Algeria.

== Commune of Aït Aissa Mimoune ==
Its headquarters are in Labdhahi. The commune includes 23 villages:

- Agharmiou
- Agouni Taga
- Aït Khelfats
- Aït Brahem (Ath Brahem)
- Akaoudj
- Akhrib Azza
- Asma
- Boussouar
- Dhalouth
- El Kelâa
- Ighil Bouchène
- Igounane Ameur (Laziv)
- Ikhelouiyène
- Imkechrene
- Menâam
- Mendjeh
- Oumlil
- Thahanouts
- Thala Gahia
- Thimeli
- Timizart Boualim
- Tizi Tekharoubt
- Thizi Tzougarth

== See also ==
- Communes of Algeria
