= Akaoudj =

Akaoudj بلدية
- Municipality
- Commune of Akaoudj
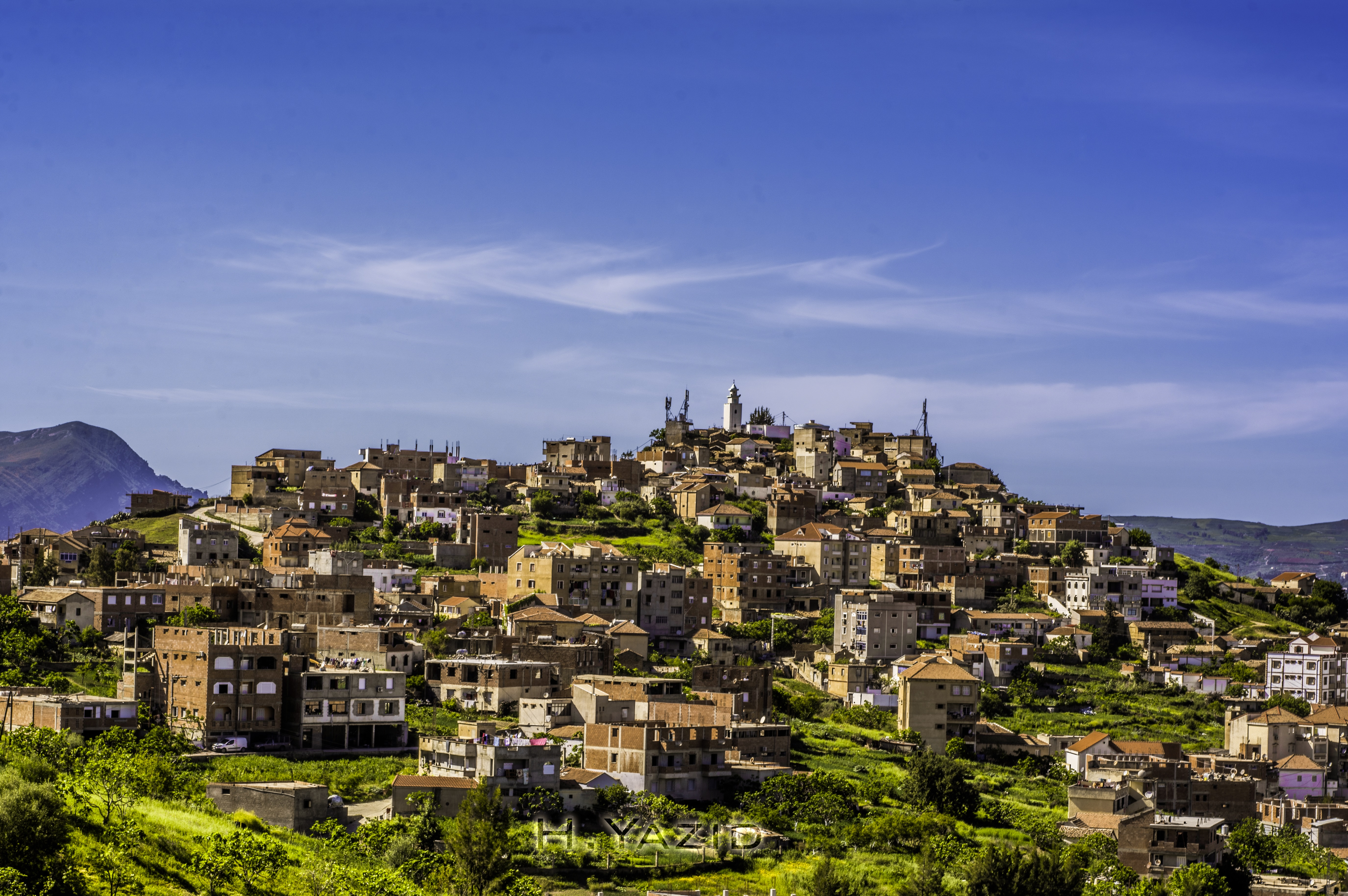

- Location of Akoudj within Algeria
- Coordinates: 36°45′N 4°4′E
- Country: Algeria
- Province: Tizi Ouzou (seat)
- District: Tizi Ouzou (seat)
- Elevation: 600 m (2,000 ft)

Population (2002)
  - Total: 8,058
- Time zone: UTC+01 (CET)
- Postal code: 15622

Akaoudj is a village in Kabylie, in north-eastern Algeria, belonging to the municipality of Aissa Mimoun (wilaya of Tizi-Ouzou). Akaoudj is located just opposite the village of Ardjaouna (village overlooking the town of Tizi Ouzou) at an altitude of about 500 meters.

== Gallery ==
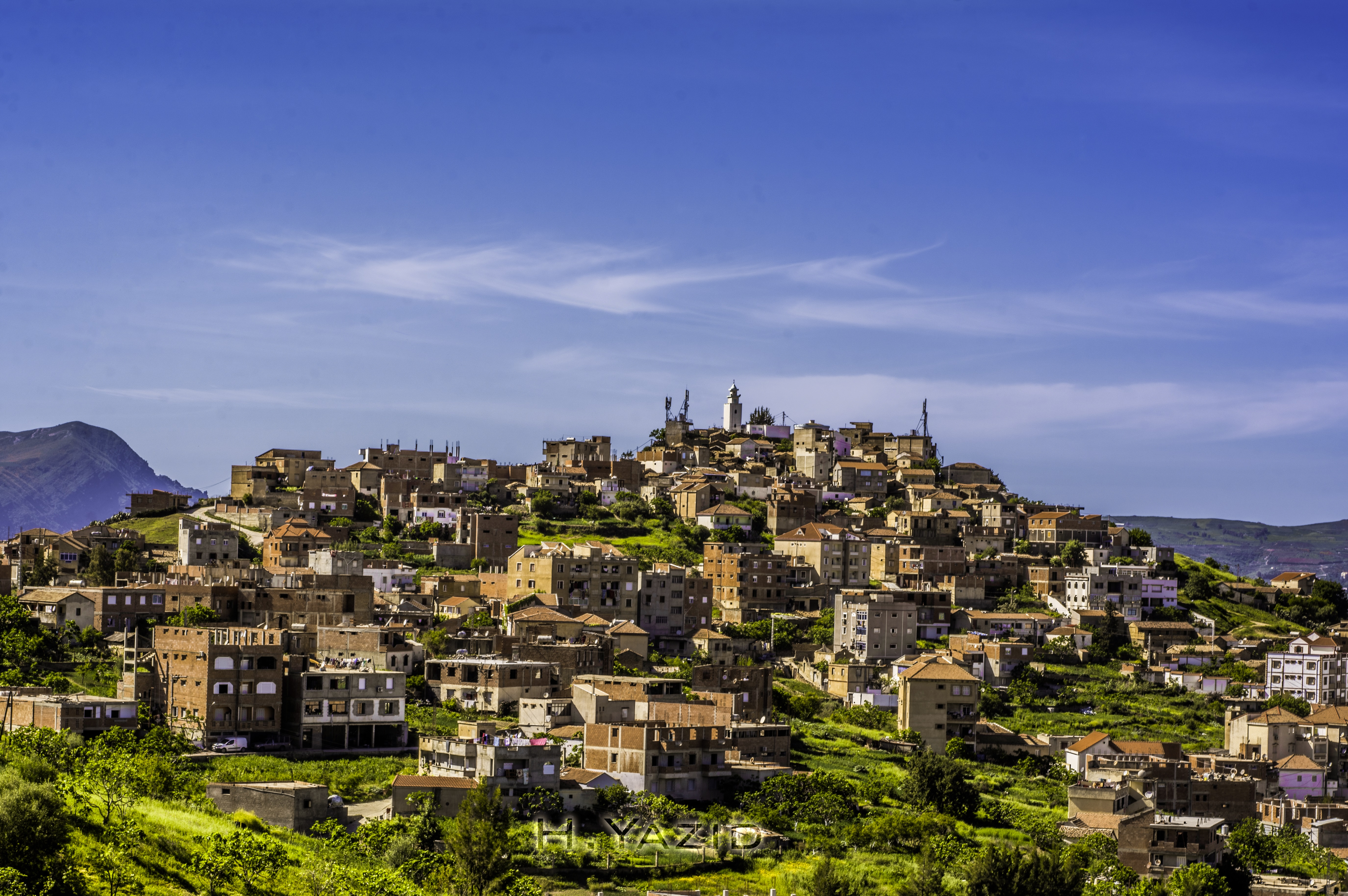

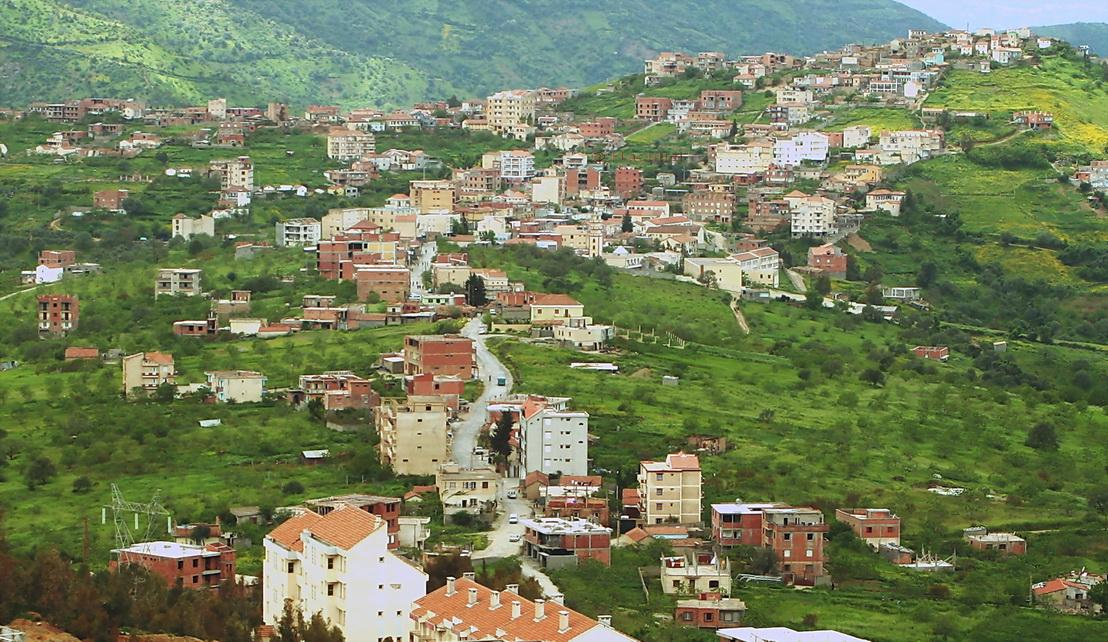

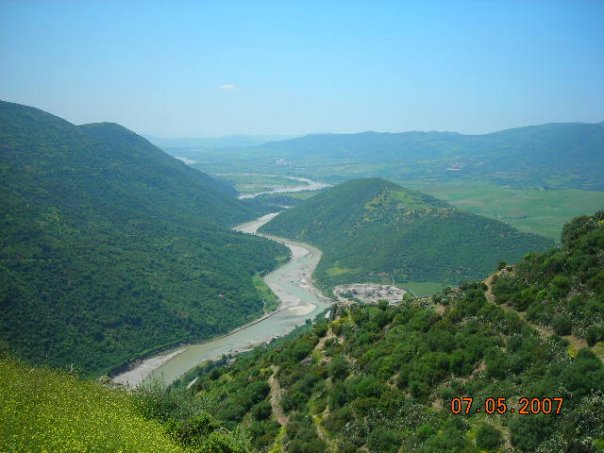

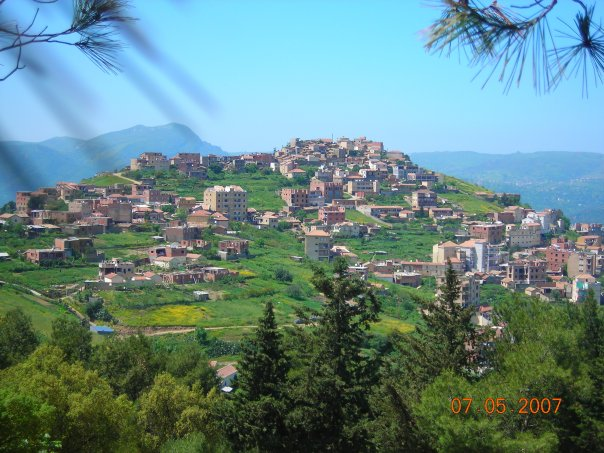

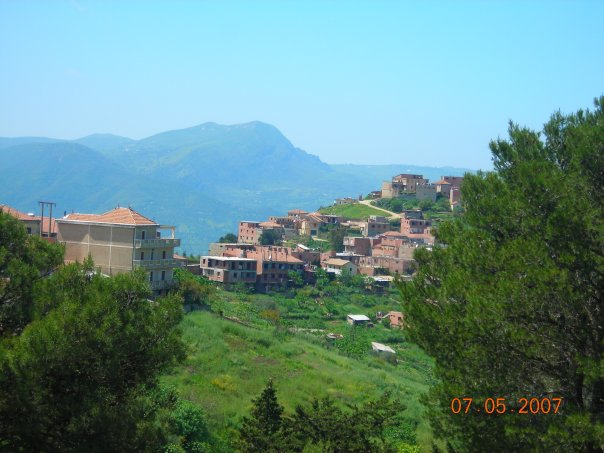
