= Ouaguenoun =

Ouaguenoun ⴰⵜ ⵡⴰⴳⵏⵓⵏ واقنون
- Commune and town

- Location within Algeria
- Country: Algeria
- Province: Tizi Ouzou Province
- District: Ouaguenoune District
- Time zone: UTC+1 (CET)

Ouaguenoun is a district east of Tizi Ouzou, Kabylie region, Algeria. Its central town is Tikobain.

Villages in Ouaguenoun include Ighil Bouchene.
