= Ighil Bouchene =

Ighil Bouchene (Kabyle: Iɣil Bucen) is a grand village in Ouaguenoun, Tizi Ouzou Province, Algeria, literally meaning Wolf's Hill. Its main inhabitants are local Kabyles. The population is around 2500. The village elevation is 802 metres above sea level.

== Political life ==
The president of "Le Committé Du Village" is chekroune abderrahmen" This is based on a centuries-long tradition of community, for which kabyles are renowned.

L'agriculture

== Religious life ==
The main religion is Sunni Islam. The mosque of the village opened in May 2004, and holds the daily prayers, Friday prayers and other religious festivities. A religious committee oversees the running of this place of worship, gather funds, organise events etc.

Recently, signs of evangelism have started to appear, with the leading figure of Dahmane Neggah, with the opening of a church. This has now closed due to lack of interest from the locals. Leaders also expressed their concern towards these unfamiliar sightings.

Postal Address

Village Ighil Bouchene
Ath Aissa Mimoune
Tizi Ouzou
CP 15624
Algeria
