= Spanish expedition to Tlemcen (1543) =

1543 expedition to Tlemcen by Spain

- Part of Spanish–Ottoman wars
- Map of the Empire of Charles V, showing Spanish Oran on North Africa
Date	27 January – 8 March 1543
Location	Kingdom of Tlemcen (present-day Algeria)
Result	Spanish victory
Territorial changes	Abu Abdallah VI restored to the Zayyanid throne as a Spanish vassal

Belligerents
(Spain) Spanish Empire; Supporters of Abu Abdallah VI	Kingdom of Tlemcen; Banu Rashid; Wattasid sultanate Minor support: Regency of Algiers

Commanders and leaders
(Spain) Count Alcaudete; Abu Abdallah VI; Ibrahim (Note: Ibrahim fought against the Spanish until he swore allegiance to Abu Abdallah VI on 7 February, a day after Abu Zayyan IV had been overthrown.)	Abu Zayyan IV; Ibrahim; Al-Mansour ben Bogani; Ahmed Segheur

Strength
14,000 infantrymen 500–1,500 horsemen	45,000 soldiers (at its peak)

Casualties and losses
Heavy	Heavy: Most of the population of Tlemcen killed or enslaved; More than 2,000 captured

The Spanish expedition to Tlemcen, also known as Tlemcen War (Note: Spanish: Guerra de Tremecén; Arabic: حرب تلمسان, romanized: harb talmisan) was led by Count Alcaudete between 27 January and 8 March 1543 with the aim of overthrowing the Zayyanid king Abu Zayyan III and replacing him with Abu Abdallah VI. The expedition was successful and Abu Abdallah was restored to the throne as a Spanish vassal.

== Background ==
Abu Muhammad II, the king of Tlemcen, died in 1540 and left two sons: Abu Abdallah Muhammad and Abu Zayyan Ahmad. The first was the eldest and the legitimate heir and was proclaimed sultan as Abu Abdallah VI. However, the second, who had the support of the Ottomans, the marabouts and several sheikhs, did not hesitate to defend his claims with arms and in a short time overthrew Abu Abdallah VI and took his place as Abu Zayyan III. The deposed sultan fled to Spanish Oran where he was well received by the governor Martín Alonso Fernández de Córdoba, also known as Count Alcaudete. The governor of Oran promised to restore him to power and Abu Abdallah promised to recognize the suzerainty of the Spanish Crown if he regained the throne. Charles I of Spain approved these conditions and, in 1542, Count Alcaudete started the preparations for the campaign.

== Preparations ==
The expedition would be carried out without support from Charles I, mainly because he was not interested in starting any further campaigns after his failed expedition to Algiers. Because of this, Count Alcaudete had to take charge of all the expenses himself.

On 9 September 1542, he went to Spain to make the preparations and recruit troops. Most of the troops were recruited in southern Spain, especially in Andalusia, and many of Count Alcaudete's relatives helped him, including Martin de Córdoba, Diego Ponce de León and Alonso de la Cueva. The Count's sons, Francisco and Martin, were sent to Málaga and Cartagena to obtain supplies. Finally, all the troops were assembled in Cartagena and embarked for Oran on 10 January. Halfway there, a storm forced some of the ships to land temporarily on the port of Jub (in the Spanish coast), but the rest reached North Africa directly.

=== Arrival at Oran ===
La Capitana (the ship where Count Alcaudete was) managed to reach Mers El Kébir on 15 January and the rest arrived later. Some ships had to disembark in Arzew due to the storm but were blocked by Moors. The Count sent his son, Alonso, to their aid and they finally expelled them.

=== Organization of the army ===
When the army was finally assembled, the count began to appoint officers who would take important commands: Alonso de Villaroel was appointed Maestre de campo, Melchior de Villaroel Sargento mayor and Juan Pacheco received command of the cavalry with his brother, Don Mendo, and Juan de Villaroel. Two of his sons, Francisco and Alonso, accompanied the Count and he handed the government of Oran to his youngest son, Martin. Alonso negotiated with Arab chiefs who had previously supported Abu Abdallah VI to try to obtain resources but to no avail.

The king of Tlemcen, Abu Zayyan III, tried to convince the count to cancel his expedition in exchange for money. On 22 January, he offered him 200,000 ducats and on the 26th, he offered him 400,000, but everything was already ready for the campaign.

== Expedition ==
=== First movements ===
Finally, on 27 January, they left Oran with 14,000 infantrymen and between 500 and 1,500 horsemen. The next day it began to rain, which made the march difficult. The Spaniards, probably due to lack of money, did not have any beasts of burden. Each Spaniard had to carry a backpack with food for eight days, only the Count and the other officers carried their food on their horses. Because of this, they were forced to abandon the artillery. Despite all these problems, the Count decided not to delay the expedition for fear of spending more resources. The rain lasted almost 3 days straight.

After the rain stopped, the army camped in the gardens of Tensalmet, west of Misserghin. It was then that they realised that they were being watched by Arabs, but without engaging in combat yet. The next day, they continued their march. A Spanish soldier, who stopped to rest despite the advice of Count Alcaudete, was killed and decapitated by them.

On 31 January they crossed the Ziz river and a few days later stopped to clean their weapons. At dusk, they found sixty lancers on a hill. Despite Count Alcaudete's orders, Martín de Cordoba and some of the soldiers charged against them, although they fled before any fighting could break out. Among the lancers was one of the principal leaders of the army of Tlemcen, the qaid Ibrahim, who almost got captured.

=== First engagement ===
Seeing the advance of the Spanish, the King of Tlemcen requested help from the Regency of Algiers and signed a treaty with Hasan Agha, but received little assistance from them. It was the natives who came to help, bringing several Arab and Berber contingents under the command of Al-Mansour ben Bogani. The army gathered and prepared to defend the road to Tlemcen opposite the Isser River, although some soldiers were sent to delay the arrival of the Spanish.

On 2 February, the Spanish noticed a considerable number of enemies approaching them "at a distance close enough to be able to speak with them". They seemed to be especially threatening the rearguard, so Count Alcaudete sent Martin de Córdoba and Francisco to cover the army from that side. There were 500 horsemen commanded by Diego Ponze de León and a company of light infantry with Escopettes and crossbows.

The enemy forces numbered about 1,500 lancers and between 6,000 and 8,000 infantrymen. Al-Mansour ben Bogani's forces, which were probably larger in number than the Tlemceni ones, tried to cut off the Spanish retreat, while Count Alcaudete had to face Ibrahim in the vanguard. The Spanish army was surrounded by mountains occupied by Arab forces. The Count quickly overcame the enemy in front of him while Alonso de Villaroel attacked them from the flank with 500 horsemen. However, they were unable to pursue them because the ground was muddy and dangerous for their cavalry. At about three in the afternoon, Al-Mansour ben Bogani decided to order the attack. The Spaniards attacked in turns but they were too few, so they asked for help from Count Alcaudete who, realizing the situation, sent 100 lancers and 200 light infantrymen. When these reinforcements arrived, they forced the Arabs to retreat.

=== March to the river ===
After this battle, the Spanish continued their march very quickly. The count wanted to take advantage of his victory and cross the Isser River at night, since if they hurried enough there would be no resistance. However, it started to rain again. Due to the mud and darkness, the Spanish lost a lot of baggage and horses and there was great disorder. Because of this, the operation had to be cancelled, so Count Alcaudete ordered the camp to be raised.

On the morning of the next day, the count received the news that Al-Mansour ben Bogani was waiting for him on the other side of the river "with all the forces of his kingdom". However, the Spanish, probably overconfident after their first victory, received the news with joy thinking that they would win again. The army started to move around eight o'clock and soon reached the banks of the river, there they saw the large Arab-Berber army and, before crossing it, the count decided to reorganize his army.

=== Battle of the Isser ===
==== Organization of the Spanish army ====
He ordered Alonso de Villaroel to place squadrons of cavalry on the four sides of the army, in addition to the infantry companies. Two squadrons were to surround the convoy from right to left; the vanguard was preceded by horsemen; in the rearguard a squadron covered the rear, joining those on the flanks. Outside the main body the Count placed skirmishers between lines of pikemen who were to protect them against enemy charges. In the vanguard were 10,700 men, among them 500 infantrymen. They were armed with pikes, except for 15 who had arquebuses or crossbows; their leaders were Alonso Hernandez de Montemayor, who had been slightly wounded the day before, and Luis de Rueda, major of Oran. The infantry on the right wing was commanded by a nephew of the Count, Don Mendo de Benavidès, and that on the left wing by Alonso de Villaroel. Finally in the rearguard were the general's eldest son, Alonso, and Juan de Villaroel. The rest of the cavalry accompanied the Count.

==== Battle ====
After these changes, the army set out for the Isser, which was swollen by the rains. At that moment the enemy attacked but the movement was not stopped. After a common prayer, the vanguard hurried to the sound of trumpets and crossed the ford "as if by a bridge," although the infantrymen were immersed in water up to their shoulders. The leaders went first and, as soon as they were on the other side of the river, the Spaniards charged against the enemy and pursued them to the top of the mountain overlooking the Isser. There the vanguard was halted; about thirty of the enemy were killed and some were captured. The Count protected during this time the passage of the rest of the army with a thousand men whom he had placed at the foot of the mountain. The enemy, disconcerted by the rapidity of this vanguard success, no longer dared to dispute the terrain, and the Spanish army, following its route, reached Tibda where they occupied a fortress near the river.

=== Spanish arrival at Tibda ===
The army spent the night in Tibdia, where they suffered many attacks that were in vain. After the troops had rested, they returned to the march. In the middle of their march, they were again attacked by a large number of Arabs. From that moment on, Count Alcaudete strictly forbade them to move away from the army under any circumstances. When night came, the count decided to camp very close to the enemy army and it was there that he received the news that the king of Tlemcen, Abu Zayyan III, was going to meet him. The count challenged him to combat. The news of Al-Mansour ben Bogani's defeat had worried the population of Tlemcen and, between 4 and 5 February, some inhabitants took their families and belongings out of the city and returned to fight the Spaniards. The next day was when the Count received the news that the king had accepted the challenge and was heading towards him with an army of 45,000 men and 400 Turks from the Regency of Algiers.

=== Battle of Hauda ben Djafar ===
==== Organization of the armies ====
The Count decided to organize his army in a manner similar to that which he had adopted when crossing the Isser: He placed two squadrons on either side of the vanguard and placed Alonso and Juan de Villaroel in command. Between these squadrons he placed half of his infantry with some horsemen and the standards. As in the previous battle, he placed skirmishers in front of the lines. He himself placed himself in the center with all the rest of his cavalry with about 300 lances. On the flanks were 1,500 light infantrymen. Finally, in the rearguard which this time did not seem willing to support the main effort, the general sent his son Francisco to replace Martín de Córdoba, who had requested the favor of fighting with the Count himself.

The army of Abu Zayyan III consisted of 1,500 lancers of the king's household, with notables from Tlemcen and some warriors from the Banu Rashid, then about 2,000 armed with muskets, crossbows and ares, commanded by the caid Ibrahim and many infantrymen. The rearguard numbered more than 2,000 lancers, among them 1,000 elite, protected by shields and dressed in brightly colored clothing; They carried with them 400 or 500 horsemen and infantrymen armed with muskets and crossbows. Finally, there was a considerable crowd of foot and horse fighters around the Spanish troops.

==== Battle ====
The Spaniards, maintaining the order that had been set for them, marched towards the enemy who was waiting for them on the heights where they had set up an ambush. As soon as they began to reach the plateau, the trumpets gave the signal to charge: 200 lances were thrown at the Christians. It was one of the captains of the vanguard, the army's maestre de campo, Alonso de Villaroel, who killed the first Moor with his arquebus. After a charge by the Arabs that hit no one, the count gave the order to a squadron to charge and the enemy seemed to retreat but it was only a feint intended to make the squadrons fall into an ambush. The Count realized this and, while continuing the pursuit, he ordered the rest of the cavalry to march and support him if he was pressed too hard. As for the rearguard, it was only to fight if it was forced to do so. The Count wanted to have all his troops at his disposal for the decisive fight that was about to begin.

It was not long before the vanguard squadrons came close enough to the Moors for enemy fire to cause casualties. Even the count's horse was wounded. The horsemen urged him to give the signal to charge but, after consulting his cousin, Martin de Cordoba, who would not comment, the Count, believing that they were still too far away, ordered the march to continue. Finally, before they had reached the arquebusiers occupying the hill, the ambushed troops appeared, both horse and infantry, shouting loudly and advancing vigorously up to the Spanish standards.

The situation was critical. The Count gave the order to charge to Martin and Diego Ponce de Leon. He himself rushed into the fray with his son Alonso, and Juan Pacheco. Martin de Córdoba was wounded by a standard-bearer. This combat, which lasted three hours, cost the troops of the king of Tlemcen a large number of horsemen and infantrymen: almost all the Turkish forces perished.

Meanwhile, the rearguard was also heavily attacked. The Moors, following their usual tactics, tried to break the Spanish troops on this side in order to throw them into disarray and cut off their retreat. But Alonso held firm despite being injured in the wrist. The Count was informed of the gravity of the situation, but, following Martin's advice, he wanted to complete the victory of the vanguard first. As soon as this was assured, he sent Mendo de Benavidès to reinforce the rearguard with light troops; he also sent Luis de Rueda and Juan de Villaroel there, who returned victorious. These reinforcements put an end to the rearguard action that had lasted three hours.

The Count's orders had been so well executed that the army, after this bitter fight, maintained the order of battle adopted at the beginning of the action. The Moors, however, seemed willing to dispute the route and 2,000 lancers were placed there, pretending to start over but it was enough with sending light troops and cavalry to put them to flight.

After this defeat, Abu Zayyan decided to flee with the few surviving troops to the desert of Angad instead of defending Tlemcen, which would be besieged.

=== Spanish occupation of Tlemcen ===
==== Spanish arrival at Tlemcen ====
The Spaniards reached the gates of Tlemcen that same afternoon and the soldiers, eager to sack the city, disbanded, although the Count was able to rally the army again. After crossing the Saf-Saf bridge, they camped in some olive groves near the city walls and, on 6 February, the inhabitants opened the gates after Count Alcaudete promised them that they would not loot the city. The Count and his army went to collect the city's resources but the loot disappointed the Spaniards: most of it had been taken by the inhabitants who fled the city. Because of this, the Spanish broke their promise and sacked the city, killing and enslaving many of its inhabitants. The Spanish went to plunder other towns near Tlemcen and brought with them part of the population that had fled along with other 2,000 Jewish and Arab captives.

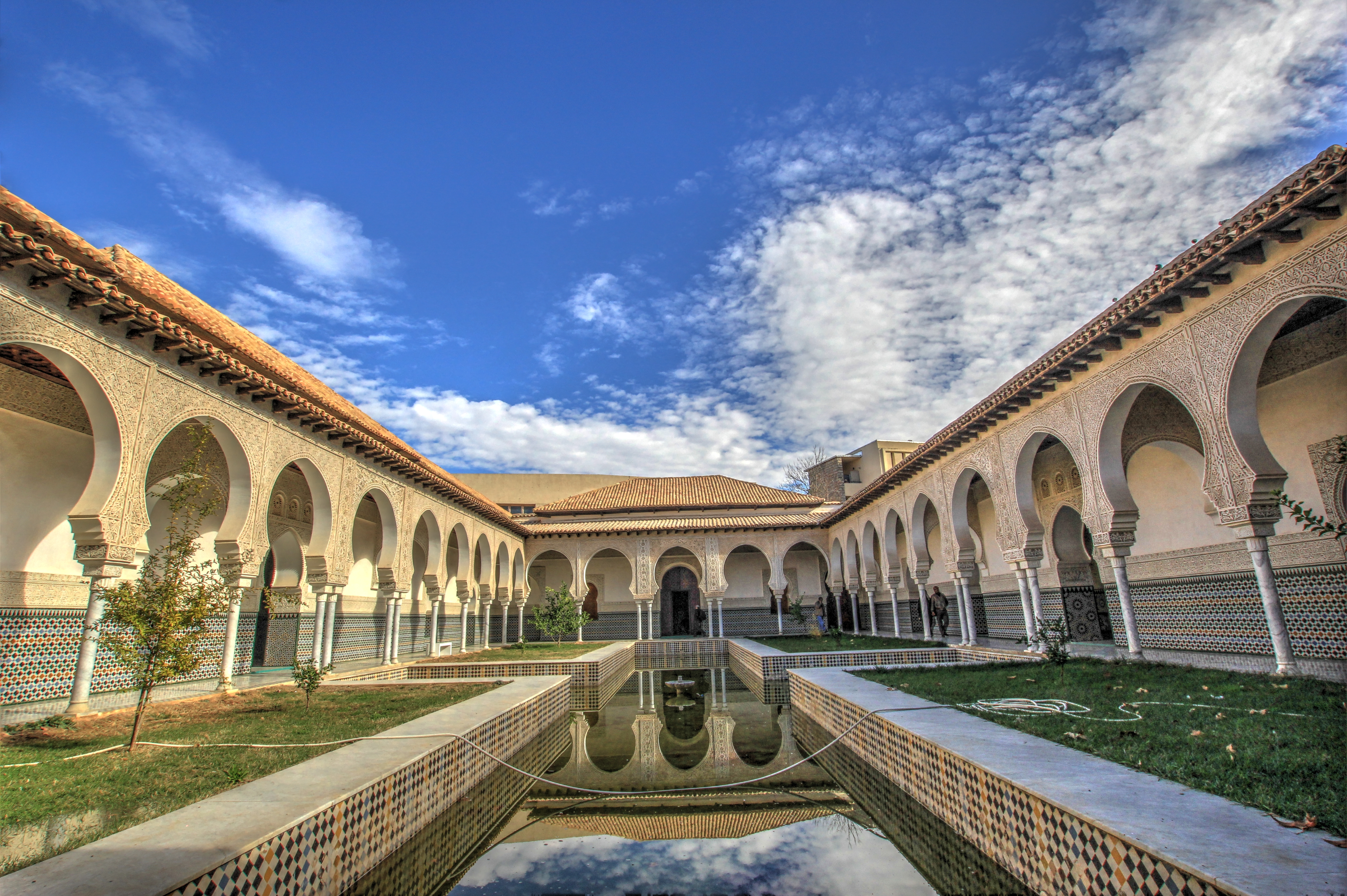
El Mechouar Palace in Tlemcen, where Abu Abdallah VI was proclaimed king.

Shortly after this, Abu Abdallah VI went to El Mechouar Palace of the city where he was proclaimed again king of Tlemcen. Although the Spanish caused many disturbances during the occupation and many notables of Tlemcen went to complain to the king, but he replied that "he had no obligations except to those who had returned him to power", which caused much discontent among the population that supported Abu Abdallah. Count Alcaudete, wanting to make sure that Abu Zayyan was not thinking of fighting again, sent Martín de Córdoba to lead a reconnaissance that reached the Zitoun wadi. On 7 February, many of the inhabitants of Tlemcen who supported Abu Zayyan returned to their city. Even Ibrahim, the commander of the deposed sultan, swore his loyalty to Abu Abdallah.

==== Engagements ====
After 15 days of the arrival of the Spaniards, the Count, advised by Ibrahim, went to attack a convoy of barley and wheat that Abu Zayyan's forces had stolen from Tlemcen before leaving. He took 150 lancers and 1,000 infantrymen with him and, despite being outnumbered, killed 60 Arabs, captured 40 and took with him 350 camels. This capture was very important as it contained the resources that the Spaniards needed.

However, the number of loyalists to Abu Zayyan III was still very high, especially after Al-Mansour ben Bogani, who also remained loyal to him, brought him a large number of Arabs. They began to threaten the outskirts of Tlemcen and attacked an isolated group of soldiers, so Count Alcaudete ordered two companies to be stationed there. After a few days, one of the captains thought he could bring back his soldiers and left the other company alone. When the Arabs found out about this, they went and attacked the company, killing 35 men including its captain. Emboldened by this success, they attempted another surprise attack on 24 February but this time they were ambushed by Ibrahim, who inflicted numerous casualties on the Arabs.

Finally, on 26 February, Count Alcaudete signed a treaty with Abu Abdallah VI by which the Tlemceni monarch recognized himself as a vassal and tributary of Charles I of Spain. According to the treaty, Abdallah had to pay annually 4,000 doubloons and numerous harnessed horses and falconets.

==== Last days in Tlemcen ====
Such a long stay in Tlemcen had weakened the Spanish army, which had already suffered numerous casualties, so they began to prepare everything to return to Oran. Count Alcaudete considered leaving an army of 1,200 men to ensure Abdallah's power, but there are several reasons why he did not do so. On the one hand, he thought it would not be a good idea because there was still a possibility of being attacked on the way back, he also planned to make another expedition to Mostaganem and all his troops were needed for the campaign. It is also possible that Charles I ordered him to return as soon as possible to Oran because he needed part of his army.

The Spanish began to make preparations to leave and the Count ordered all the luggage to be collected. He also collected some campaign pieces that he found in the city's arsenal and the 4 cannons that he lost during his failed expedition to Mostaganem in 1535: they had to be repaired because they hadn't been used since then. The departure from the city was planned for 29 February but had to be postponed until the following day because the Arabs loyal to Abu Zayyan, who had been sent a challenge, negotiated as if they wanted to submit. Finally, the Spanish troops left the city on 1 March. The large number of captives caused concern among the officers, who suggested to the Count that they should be beheaded and the loot burned, but he rejected the idea, fearing to displease his army.

=== Way back to Oran ===
==== Battle of the Olive Grove ====
After making sure that no Christians were left behind, the last Spaniards left the city and the gates were closed. Count Alcaudete's army was supposed to pass through a very narrow passage surrounded by olive trees, but what they did not know was that an army of the Wattasid Sultanate and the Banu Rashid led by Ahmed Segheur was hiding among the trees. The Moroccan forces began to surround and prepare to attack them and eventually a large number of men rushed against the rearguard. The Count, upon learning of this, ran there with some reinforcements. The danger was great: the Moroccan soldiers were more than twice as many as the Spanish army and it was almost impossible to fight them because they were taking shelter in the trees. The Count reached a glade with his cavalry before the Moroccans, who intended to surround the rearguard, although they were still too far from the vanguard. Martín de Córdoba gathered the dead and wounded from the rearguard, gathered the skirmishers and headed towards the vanguard which was on the plain. He crossed the mass of Moroccans and fired some cannonballs towards the Arabs who were still fighting in the woods. This rigor disconcerted the Moors who dinally were driven off the rearguard. The battle had lasted between six and seven hours and both sides suffered numerous casualties, although the Moroccans did not retreat completely.

==== Occupation of the bridge of Safsaf ====
After the battle of the Olives, Count Alcaudete sent Martin de Cordoba to occupy the bridge of Safsaf with the vanguard but they were pursued. Count Alcaudete feared that Martin de Cordoba's forces were insufficient and ordered him to stop and defend himself but he did not listen and took possession of the bridge. The Moroccans tried to recapture the bridge but were then ambushed by the Count's army, causing them to retreat.

Not only did the king of Tlemcen, Abu Abdallah VI, send a letter of congratulations to Count Alcaudete, but Ahmed Segheur, the commander leading the Moroccan troops, declared himself a "friend" and "ally" of the Spanish, meaning that the road to Oran was open.

==== Final engagements ====
The army continued its march and did not sight any enemy until 4 March, when 1,000 Moors attacked the rearguard but were quickly driven back. The next day, at the crossing to Rio Salado (present-day El Malah), they dispersed 100 horsemen with two cannon shots. On 6 March, some horsemen attacked again but were driven back after a few cannon shots. Finally, on 8 March, the army reached Oran, ending the expedition.

== Aftermath ==
Despite the defeat, Abu Zayyan was determined to regain the throne. In late 1543 or early 1544, he began recruiting soldiers in the western provinces of the kingdom and, after gathering a considerably large army, laid siege to Tlemcen. Abu Abdallah emerged from the walls of the city and defeated him. He was unable to capture his brother and returned to Tlemcen. However, the inhabitants of the city, who supported Abu Zayyan III, closed the gates to Abu Abdallah, forcing him to flee again to Oran with a few horsemen. When Abu Zayyan returned to the city, he was proclaimed king again. Halfway to Oran, Abu Abdallah was captured and executed on the orders of his brother.

On March 21, 1543, Count Alcaudete made another expedition, this time to Mostaganem. However he was defeated and forced to retreat. Despite his defeat, he began another expedition towards Mostaganem in August of that same year but it was also unsuccessful.

== Bibliography ==
- Bargès, Jean Joseph Léandre (1887). Complément de l'histoire des Beni-Zeiyan, rois de Tlemcen, ouvrage du cheikh Mohammed Abd'al-Djalil al-Tenessy (in French). Paris: E. Leroux.
- Brill, E. J. (1993). E.J. Brill's First Encyclopaedia of Islam: 1913-1936. A - Bābā Beg. BRILL. ISBN 978-90-04-09787-2.
- Ruff, Paul (15 October 1998). "La campagne de Tlemcen (1543)". La domination espagnole à Oran sous le gouvernement du comte d'Alcaudete, 1534-1558 (in French). Editions Bouchène. pp. 74–101. ISBN 978-2-35676-083-8.
- Fuensanta del Valle, Feliciano Ramírez de Arellano; Rayón, José León Sancho (1881). "Guerra de Tremecen". Guerras de los españoles en África, 1542, 1543 y 1632 (in Spanish). M. Ginesta. pp. 5–152.
- Schreier, Joshua (16 May 2017). The Merchants of Oran: A Jewish Port at the Dawn of Empire. Stanford University Press. ISBN 978-1-5036-0216-8.
- Liang, Yuen-Gen (21 September 2011). Family and Empire: The Fernández de Córdoba and the Spanish Realm. University of Pennsylvania Press. ISBN 978-0-8122-0437-7.
- Leroux, Ernest (1900). Publications de l'École des lettres d'Alger: Bulletin de correspondance africaine (in French). University of California Press.
- Tello, Manuel (1888). Memorias de la Real Academia de la Historia (in Spanish). Vol. 11. Royal Academy of History.
- de Vera, León Galindo (1884). Historia vicisitudes y política tradicional de España respecto de sus posesiones en las costas de África desde la monarquía gótica y en los tiempos posteriores á la restauración hasta el último siglo (in Spanish). University of Oxford Press.
