= Siege of Oran (1556) =

1556 siege

- Part of Spanish–Ottoman wars
Date	August 1556
Location	Oran, Algeria
Result	Siege lifted

Belligerents
Regency of Algiers	Kingdom of Spain

Commanders and leaders
Muhammad Kurdogli	Martin Fernández

Strength
40 galleys	Unknown

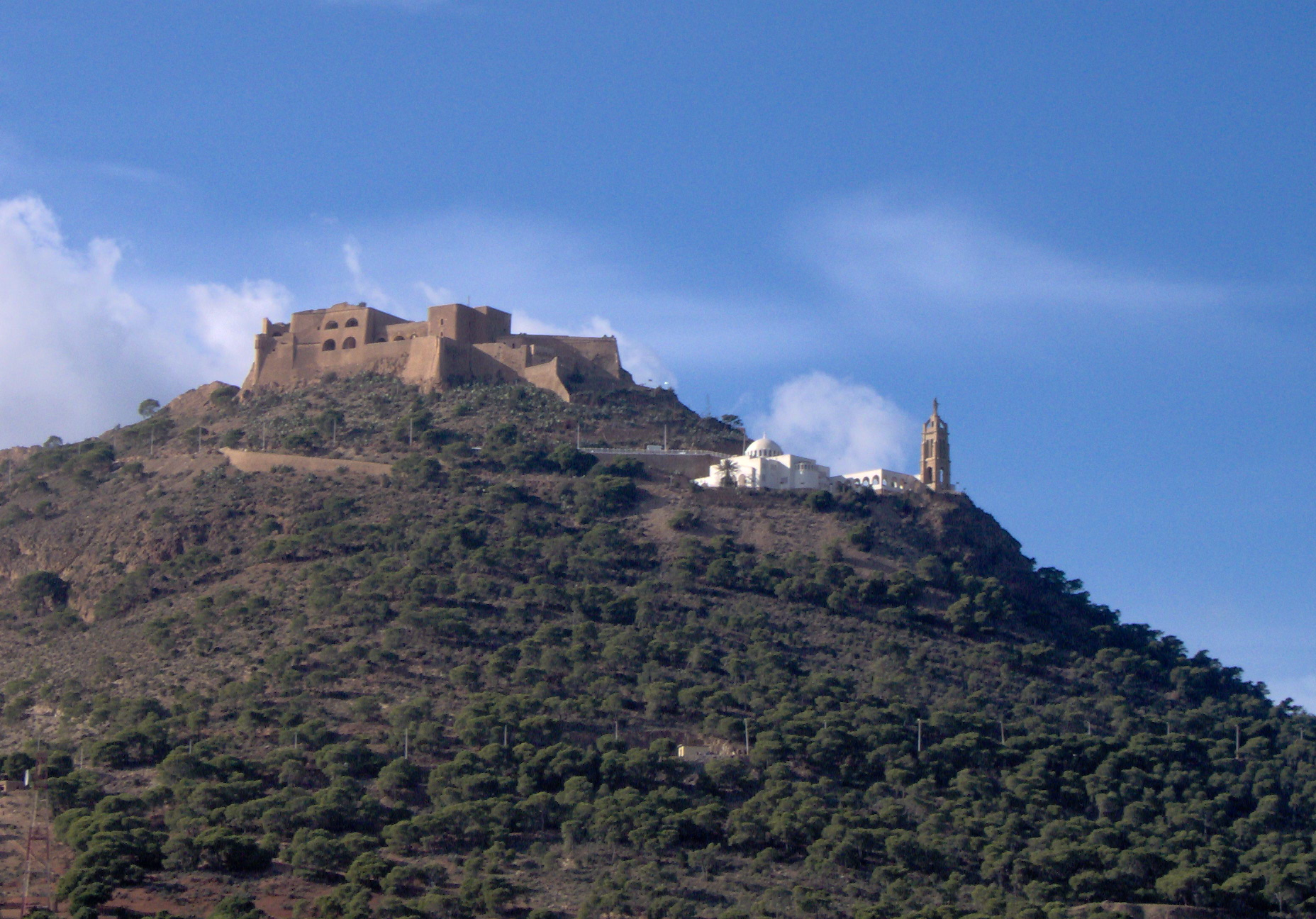
View of the Spanish garrison’s “Fort of Santa Cruz” in Oran, Algeria

The siege of Oran of 1556 occurred when Ottoman troops from Algiers besieged the Spanish garrison in Oran. The siege, by land and sea, was ultimately lifted without success. Although Algerian forces were able to win a couple of skirmishes against the Spanish army, it had to be lifted in August 1556 when the Ottoman fleet of 40 galleys was recalled for duty in the Eastern Mediterranean.

During the time the Ottomans were occupied in the siege, the Moroccans, who were allied with the Spanish, occupied the city of Tlemcen but Algerian forces were able to reconquer it the following year during the Campaign of Tlemcen, led by Hassan Pacha and Aït Abbas contingents from Kabylia.

== See also ==
- Sieges of Oran and Mers El Kébir
