= Abu Zayyan IV =

- Emir
- Possible contemporary depiction of Abu Zayyan c. 1545

Sultan of Tlemcen
- Reign: 1540 – 1543
- Predecessor: Abu Abdallah VI
- Successor: Abu Abdallah VI
- Reign: January 1544 – 1550
- Predecessor: Abu Abdallah VI
- Successor: Al Hassan
- Died: 1550; Tlemcen (Note: Likely died at the El Mechouar Palace)
- Dynasty: Zayyanid
- Father: Abu Muhammad II
- Religion: Islam
- Military career
- Allegiance: Kingdom of Tlemcen
- Conflicts: Tlemcen civil war

Abu Zayyan IV (Note: Numbered this way due to an ephemeral sultan of the same name in 1515-1516 and 1518) also known by his full name Mohammad Ahmad ibn Abu Mohammed Abdallah II was the twenty-seventh monarch of the Zayyanid dynasty. He was based in the city of Algiers and reigned from 1540 to 1543 in opposition to his brother Abu Abdullah VI, and again from 1544 until his death in 1550.

== Biography ==
=== First reign ===
His father, Muhammed Abu Abdallah, died in 1540, leaving behind two children: Abu Abdallah Muhammad and Abu Zayyan himself. The first one was the legitimate heir and was proclaimed Sultan under the name Abu Abdallah VI; the latter enjoyed the support of the Ottomans, the marabouts, and several sheikhs who readily put forward his claims to the title of emir/sultan. Abu Zayyan IV thus overthrew Abu Abdallah VI who had to flee to Oran, he would be received by the Count of Alcaudete. The governor of Oran promised to restore him to power and Abu Abdallah promised to recognize the suzerainty of the Spanish Crown if he regained the throne. Charles V approved these conditions and, in 1542, Count Alcaudete started the preparations for the campaign.

=== Campaign against him ===
The expedition would be carried out without support from Charles V, mainly because he was not interested in starting any further campaigns after his failed expedition to Algiers. Because of this, Count Alcaudete had to take charge of all the expenses himself.

On October 21, 1541, the Spanish fleet, commanded by Charles V arrived at Algiers. Troops landed on the 23rd in order to besiege the city, having encircled it, and though the Spaniards did not expect to encounter great difficulties in its capture, they could not do so with ease, primarily on account of the destruction of a large portion of the fleet during the night of October 26/27 by a storm. Hasan Agha, serving as acting governor in the absence of Hayreddin Barbarossa took advantage of the ensuing confusion to attack the Spanish troops, forcing them to abandon their positions. A few days later, the remnants of the fleet re-embarked for a second attempt; however, the return voyage saw further storms. Because of that, only half of the fleet and the soldiers managed to make it back to Spain.

Abu Abdullah, who had now become a vassal of Spain, was to be restored to the throne, and the governor of Oran pledged his support. Charles V authorized the operation and mobilized an army to reinstate Abdullah as sultan of Tlemcen. In January 1543, a force consisting of 1,000 garrison troops and 400 Arabs was dispatched toward Tlemcen under the command of Alfonso Martinez. Although Abu Abdallah VI had claimed that many men would join their ranks, in reality, almost no one joined them.

His forces were overwhelmed by the army of Abu Zayyan, which outnumbered them by ten times the size of their own army. Thus the Spaniards were massacred at Chaabat El-Leham, and the few who managed to escape to Oran brought news of the defeat in January 1543. Upon learning of the defeat, Charles V immediately ordered another army to be sent; this force arrived in Oran shortly thereafter, bringing the total number of Spanish troops to 14,000. They advanced on Tlemcen and laid siege to the city. The battle lasted about three hours, at the end of which the Spaniards held the field. Abu Zayyan subsequently retreated into the Angad desert, awaiting an other occasion to reclaim his throne.

Although the Spaniards had promised to respect the lives and property of the inhabitants and to enter Tlemcen peacefully, the soldiers didn't respect their promise and engaged in looting, murdering, and enslaving those they encountered. Abu Abdallah VI was then restored to the throne. After 40 days of rest, the Spanish troops set off in pursuit of Abu Zayyan IV, but without success.

=== Second reign ===
Following this, Abu Zayyan IV's reputation as a hero among his people persisted, though his brother Abdullah would be viewed as a spanish puppet. Abu Zayyan IV managed to rally thousands of his supporters in the western provinces, with whom he marched on Tlemcen with shortly after, besieging the city. However, Abu Abdallah VI led his own forces out and defeated his brother’s army. Abu Abdallah VI even tried to pursue Abu Zayyan, but upon returning to the city, he found the gates closed against him in December 1543. During his absence, the nobility had staged a coup, so left without supporters, Abu Abdallah VI was forced to retreat toward Oran, while Abu Zayyan IV was invited into Tlemcen and crowned in January 1544. Meanwhile, Halfway to Oran, Abu Abdallah VI was captured and executed on the orders of his brother.

In agreement with Hayreddin Barbarossa, Abu Zayyan IV declared himself a vassal of the Sublime Porte. Consequently, the Ottoman Sultan Suleiman the Magnificent was acclaimed during Friday prayers.

=== Death and succession ===
Abu Zayyan IV ruled peacefully from then until his death between 1549 and 1550, a period marked by a Saadian invasion supported by his former head of government who was also the leader of the Beni Rached tribe and his own father-in-law. The Zayyanid territories were diminished, the coastal strip between the Tafna River and Mostaganem fell under Spanish control, while the region stretching from Algiers inland toward Ténès, Miliana, and the headwaters of the Chelif River came under direct Ottoman administration. Following his death, he was succeeded by his other brother, Al Hassan ibn Abu Muhammad II who would become the last ruler of the kingdom.

== See also ==
- Kingdom of Tlemcen
- Al Hassan ibn Abu Muhammad II
- Abu Abdallah VI

== Sources ==
- Bargès, Jean Joseph Léandre (1887). Complément de l'histoire des Beni-Zeiyan, rois de Tlemcen, ouvrage du cheikh Mohammed Abd'al-Djalil al-Tenessy (in French). Paris: E. Leroux.
- Brill, E. J. (1993). E.J. Brill's First Encyclopaedia of Islam: 1913-1936. A - Bābā Beg. BRILL. ISBN 978-90-04-09787-2.
- Liang, Yuen-Gen (21 September 2011). Family and Empire: The Fernández de Córdoba and the Spanish Realm. University of Pennsylvania Press. ISBN 978-0-8122-0437-7.
- Ruff, Paul (15 October 1998). "La campagne de Tlemcen (1543)". La domination espagnole à Oran sous le gouvernement du comte d'Alcaudete, 1534-1558 (in French). Editions Bouchène. pp. 74–101. ISBN 978-2-35676-083-8.
