= Battle of Algiers =

Battle of Algiers or Algiers expedition may refer to:

- Capture of Algiers (1516), during the Ottoman–Habsburg wars
- Algiers expedition (1516), during the Ottoman–Habsburg wars
- Algiers expedition (1519), during the Ottoman–Habsburg wars
- Capture of Peñón of Algiers (1529), during the Ottoman–Habsburg wars
- Algiers expedition (1541), during the Ottoman–Habsburg wars
- Algiers expedition (1567), during the Ottoman-Habsburg wars
- Bombardment of Algiers (1682), during the Franco-Algerian war
- Bombardment of Algiers (1683), during the Franco-Algerian war
- Bombardment of Algiers (1688), during the Franco-Algerian war
- Bombardment of Algiers (1770), during the Dano–Algerian War
- Invasion of Algiers (1775), during the Spanish–Algerian War
- Bombardment of Algiers (1783), during the Spanish–Algerian War
- Bombardment of Algiers (1784), during the Spanish–Algerian War
- Bombardment of Algiers (1816), during the Barbary slave trade
- Invasion of Algiers (1830), during the French conquest of Algeria
- Raid on Algiers, during World War II
- Battle of Algiers, during World War II
- Battle of Algiers (1956–1957), during the Algerian War
  - The Battle of Algiers, a 1966 Italian-Algerian film about the battle
