= Battle of the Olive Grove =

Battle of the Olive Grove may refer to:

- Battle of the Olive Grove of Kountouras (1205), between Frankish Crusaders and local Greeks.
- Battle of the Olive Grove (1543), between Spanish and Wattasid troops.
