= Al Hassan ibn Abu Muhammad II =

Al Hassan
- Emir
- Possible depiction of Al Hassan

Sultan of Tlemcen
- Reign: 1550 – 1555
- Predecessor: Abu Zayyan IV
- Successor: Ottoman conquest
- Died: 1558; Spanish Oran
- Issue: Charles
- Dynasty: Zayyanid
- Father: Abu Muhammad II
- Religion: Islam; Christianity

Al-Hassan ibn Abu Muhammad II, sometimes Al Hassan ibn Abu Muh II or simply Al-Hassan (died 1558, Oran), was the twenty-eighth and final ruler of the Kingdom of Tlemcen reigning from 1550 to 1555. Following his overthrow, the Zayyanid territories came under Ottoman vassalage and was annexed by the Regency of Algiers.

== Biography ==
Al-Hassan succeeded his brother Abu Zayyan III in 1550.

At that time, part of the Zayyanid territories was already under Spanish control, while another part (including Algiers) was held by the pirate Hayreddin Barbarossa, who acknowledged himself as an Ottoman vassal.

His brother Abu Zayyan came to power under the banner of war against the Christians as the Spanish were backing Abu Zayyan and al-Hassan's older brother, Abu Abdullah VI and consequently, there was strong pro-Ottoman sentiment among the nobility.

Around 1551, the Sharifians briefly captured Mostaganem and Tlemcen, but once their army was recalled home, the Turks liberated Mostaganem and reinstated the Emir of Tlemcen.

In 1554, a rumor spread that Al-Hassan had contacted the Spaniards in Oran, hoping for their assistance in expelling the Turks; the Beylerbey Salah Rais thus immediately instigated a rebellion.

The assembly of ulema was compelled to declare Al-Hassan a traitor and unfit for the throne. In early 1555, Al-Hassan was forced to leave Tlemcen for good and flee to Oran, where Martin Alonso Fernández de Córdoba Montemayor y Velasco, Count of Alcaudete (Spanish governor from 1538 to 1558), was succeeded by Alonso de Cordova y Fernandez de Velasco also Count of Alcaudete. The Spaniards welcomed the deposed emir and granted him refuge under Spanish protection.

Al Hassan was baptized and lived under the name of Carlos until his death by plague a few years later in 1558. Zayyanid rule thus came to an end. He left a son, who was baptized under the name Carlos and received lands in Castile from Emperor Charles V.

Under the Ottoman Empire the once prosperous city of Tlemcen quickly lost its former importance, becoming a sleepy provincial town. The failure of the kingdom to become a powerful state can be explained by relative fragmentation, the constant internal disputes and the reliance on irregular Arab nomads for the military.

== See also ==
- Abdalwadides
- Tlemcen
- Regency of Algiers

== Bibliography ==
- Mohamed Elhadri (2007). "Monnaies et relations diplomatiques sous les derniers Zayyānides de Tlemcen. Quelques remarques sur des problèmes d’attribution" (in French)
- Wingfield, Lewis (1868). Under the Palms in Algeria and Tunis ... Hurst and Blackett.
