= Expedition to Mostaganem (1543) =

- Part of Spanish–Ottoman wars
Date	21 March – 1 April 1543
Location	Mostaganem
Result	Ottoman–Algerian victory

Belligerents
Regency of Algiers	Spanish Empire

Commanders and leaders
Hasan Agha; Al-Mansour ben Bogani; Hamida El-Aouda'	Count Alcaudete; Alonso de Córdoba; Martín de Córdoba; Melchor de villarroel

Units involved
Unknown	7,000 men 5 cannons

Casualties and losses
Unknown	Heavy

The Expedition to Mostaganem of 1543 was a failed expedition against the Algerian city of Mostaganem by the Spanish forces of Count Alcaudete.

== Background ==
After the Spanish installed a vassal king at Tlemcen, they managed to block the land route from Oran to the Ottomans; however, the sea route was left exposed, and to seize it, the Spanish had to seize Mostaganem. Count Alcaudete began preparations for a new campaign against Mostaganem after a few days of rest. They prepared an army of 7,000 men and had 5 field cannons.

== Expedition ==
The Spanish left on March 21, 1543. The count took his eldest son, Alonso, with him. The count's fourth son, Martin, and Melchor de Villarroel led the vanguard. On March 22, they established their camp at Arzew. The next day, the Spanish were attacked by Ottoman galleys, which Hassan Agha sent to 6 ships. They managed to cause casualties, and the Spanish exchanged fire. The Ottoman galley had to retreat due to winds. At 3 o'clock, the Spanish reached the river of Macta and the Spanish soldiers built the bridge to pass the cannons.

The native allies under Sheikh Guirref joined the Spanish and sent their troops to scout the way. The Spanish arrived at Mazagran and attacked it, but they were exposed to the fire of Ottoman galleys. The Count changed his route and went to the plateau; however, they saw a large army of Algerians under Al-Mansour ben Bogani and Hamida El-Aouda'. The Spanish retreated without a fight and established their camp near Mazagran, where they would spend three days fighting with Ottoman galleys and the Algerian natives.

The Count learned through his spies that Mostaganem was garrisoned by 1,500 men with 30 cannons. The count knew that attacking it would be impossible and ordered a retreat. The Spanish found themselves surrounded by a large number of Algerian infantry alongside the Ottoman galleys. The Spanish had to fight tirelessly from Mazagran to the ramparts of Oran; despite the bravery of the Spanish troops, they suffered heavy losses during their march. They finally arrived in Oran on April 1.

== See also ==
- Expedition to Mostaganem (1547)
- Expedition to Mostaganem (1558)

== Sources ==
- Paul Ruff (1900), Spanish domination in Oran under the government of the Count of Alcaudete 1534–1558.
- de Grammont, Henri Delmas (1887). Histoire d'Alger sous la domination turque. Paris: E. Leroux.
