= Battle of Formentera =

1529 Ottoman–Spanish naval battle

Coordinates: 38°42′N 1°27′E

Battle of Formentera (1529)
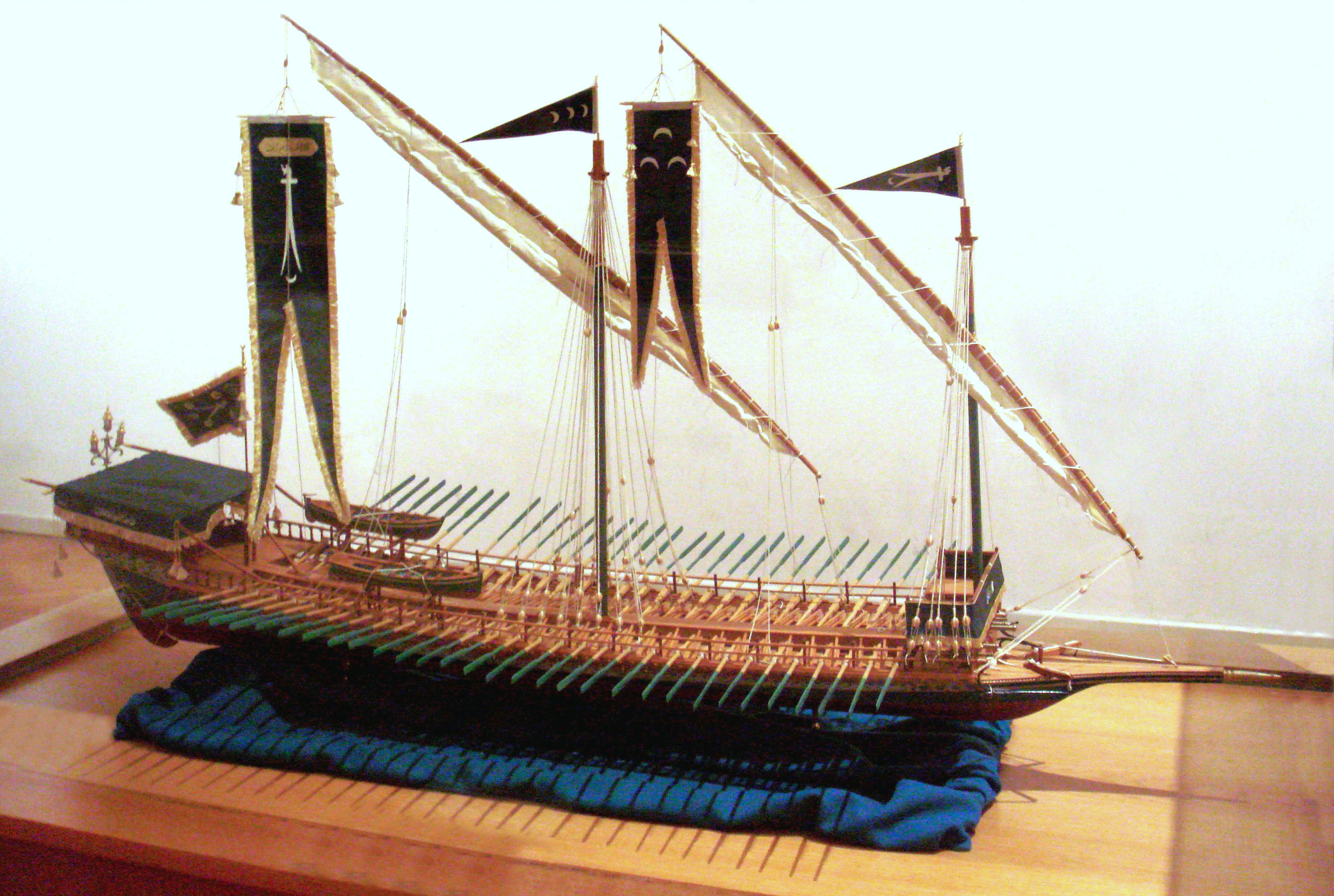
- Barbarossa galley in France 1543.
Date	28 October 1529
Location	Formentera
Result	Ottoman-Algerian victory

Belligerents
Regency of Algiers	(Spain) Spanish Empire

Commanders and leaders
Aydin Reis	(Spain) Rodrigo Portuondo †

Strength
15 galleys 4 fustas	8 galleys

Casualties and losses
Minor	7 galleys captured

The Battle of Formentara occurred on 28 October 1529 when an Ottoman fleet under Aydin Reis captured a small Spanish fleet of eight galleys off the island of Formentera near Ibiza.

== Background ==
In 1529, fifteen Barbary ships from Algiers under Aydin Reis, known as Caccia Diavolo, were raiding the coast of Valencia and ferrying Moriscos from Spain to Algeria. He capitalized on the fact that most of the attention of the Spanish armada was put in escorting the Habsburg emperor Charles V to Genoa. Aydin was joined by four Barbary fustas, who alerted him that Rodrigo Portuondo, captain of the galley squad of Granada, had returned from Genoa and was waiting for him with eight galleys after hearing about his sackings in Ibiza.

== Previous movements ==
Aydin headed quickly for Algiers, with his fleet unprepared to give battle due to its load of passengers, slaves and goods, but found no favorable wind, so he tried to hide in the coast of Formentera. When he saw Portuondo's fleet arrive nonetheless, the Ottoman abandoned the cargo and non-combatants in Formentera and ordered to flee.

== Battle ==
Portuondo chased Aydin abandoning all prudence, but his slave galleys, most of them recent French prisoners from the Italian War of 1521–1526, proved unreliable to keep the pace. The Spanish ships became thus increasingly separated, to the point Portuondo's flagship was practically alone at the head of the convoy. When Aydin saw his chance, he turned back and assaulted the ship with three of his own, capturing it quickly, with Portuondo dying in a desperate defense. Aydin then attacked the same way the stunned rest of the fleet, one by one at time, with the help of his advantage in numbers. At the end, all but one of the eight Spanish galleys were taken.

== Aftermath ==
The prisoners were taken as slaves to the recently conquered city of Algiers, while 1000 Muslim galley slaves were liberated. Portuondo was succeeded by Álvaro de Bazán the Elder at the head of the squad of Granada.
