= Algiers expedition (1567) =

Failed invasion of Algiers by Spain in 1567

Algiers Expedition (1567)
- Part of Ottoman–Habsburg wars
- Map of Algiers c. 1565
Date	October 1567
Location	Algiers, Regency of Algiers
Result	Algerian victory

Belligerents
Regency of Algiers	Spanish Empire

Commanders and leaders
(Regency of Algiers) Muhammad I Pasha (Regency of Algiers) Della Raïs	(Spanish Empire) Philip II of Spain (Spanish Empire) Juan Gascon (executed)

Strength
4 Galleys	2 Galleys

Casualties and losses
Unknown	2 Galleys captured

The Algiers Expedition in 1567 was a failed Spanish attempt to invade Algiers by setting fire to the Algerian navy at night. The commander leading this expedition was executed.

== Context ==
Juan Gascon was a Spanish marine from Valencia who had the idea of invading Algiers by calling for a slave rebellion among Spanish captives in Algiers. In the middle of 1567, he was given the command of 2 Spanish galleys, and with the authorization of Phillip II, he waited for the moment when the Algerian navy had to retreat from waters due to frequent storms in Fall and landed in the port of Algiers in October 1567.

== Expedition ==
After landing with his men, Juan Gascon found that the Algerian ships were tied together in the harbor, so he provided his men with inflammable materials (possibly fireworks) before going towards the Marine's tower and gave three loud knocks with his dagger, leaving it there as a token of his intrepidity. Meanwhile, his men did not manage to set the navy ablaze, making such a bustle and confusion that it alarmed the Algerian guards stationed in the bastion, who, who alerted the whole garrison of Algiers, Juan ordered his men to hold their ground, but eventually sensing the danger, he was forced to retreat, leaving the scene with all possible haste and taking only 20 Spanish captives with him.

When Muhammad I knew about what happened he sent Della Raïs and 4 Galleys to pursue Juan and his men, while Juan slowed his galleys down after being more than 8 kilometers from Algiers to take some rest, however he woke up by the sight of the 4 Algerian galleys sailing towards him and after a hard battle, Juan was defeated and captured along with his Galleys and brought to Muhammad I, where the people of Algiers expressed their will for Juan to be executed, while the Reis wanted Juan to become a captive, Muhammad I ordered a gibbet to be installed where the Spaniards had landed, and Juan Gascon was executed, he was hoisted by a pulley above the execution wall and throw down upon a hook which caused instant death.
