= Expedition to Mostaganem (1547) =

- Part of Spanish–Ottoman wars
Date	21 – 28 August 1547
Location	Mostaganem
Result	Ottoman–Algerian victory

Belligerents
Regency of Algiers	Spanish Empire

Commanders and leaders
Hasan Pasha	Count Alcaudete; Martín de Córdoba; Luis de Rueda

Units involved
Garrison: 42 men	Unknown

Casualties and losses
Unknown	Heavy

The Expedition to Mostaganem of 1547 was a failed Spanish expedition mounted against Mostaganem by the Spanish forces of Count Alcaudete.

== Expedition ==
In 1547, Count Alcaudete set out to capture Mostaganem. He had his son, Martin, join him. On August 21, the Spanish army arrived at Mazagran in morning and captured it without resistance. On the same day, in the evening, the Spanish arrived at Mostaganem's outskirts and bombarded the city with 100 cannon shots. The Spanish learned through prisoners that the city was garrisoned by 42 Ottoman soldiers. Seeing the gunpowder was running out, he dispatched to Oran to provide more, allowing the garrison to receive more reinforcements, bringing with them a large number of native Algerians.

The Bombardment caused a large breach and on 27th, the count ordered an assault. The Spanish troops assaulted the walls, and the Ottomans retired, but when they saw the disorder in the Spanish ranks, the Ottomans returned fire, killing many of the Spanish troops, including their general Mestre de camp. The Spanish began retreating, but they were chased by the garrison, which began putting swords on them. The count, seeing the terrible casualties, ordered a retreat. The garrison then chased the Spanish and almost captured their batteries. The attack caused confusion in their ranks, and by nightfall, the Spanish officers suggested retreating by sea, but the count refused.

On the evening of the next day, the Ottoman and the Algerians attacked the Spanish; however, thanks to the composure of the count, his son, and Luis de Rueda, they were able to repel the attack and force them to retreat; however, the Spanish did not have enough cavalry to chase them, had they had enough cavalry, they would've been able to capture Mostaganem. The Spanish evacuated their wounded and sick on ships, and the count returned to Oran three days later.

== Aftermath ==
The failure of the expedition were caused by improper preparations, shortage of ammunition, a lack of knowledge regarding enemy, and lack of experience among the soldiers. The count did not give up on taking Mostaganem. Another expedition was dispatched in 1558 but it would end in a fiasco for the Spanish troops.

== See also ==
- Expedition to Mostaganem (1543)
- Expedition to Mostaganem (1558)

== Sources ==
- Paul Ruff (1900), Spanish domination in Oran under the government of the Count of Alcaudete 1534–1558.
- de Grammont, Henri Delmas (1887). Histoire d'Alger sous la domination turque. Paris: E. Leroux.
