= Abu Abdallah VI =

Emir of Tlemcen, 1540 and 1543

- Emir
- Dinar of Abu Abdallah VI from an unknown mint

Sultan of Tlemcen
- Reign: 1540
- Predecessor: Abu Muhammad II
- Successor: Abu Zayyan IV
- Reign: May 1543 – December 1543
- Predecessor: Abu Zayyan IV
- Successor: Abu Zayyan IV
- Died: early 1544
- Dynasty: Zayyanid
- Father: Abu Muhammad II
- Religion: Islam
- Military career
- Allegiance: Spanish Empire
- Conflicts: Tlemcen civil war

Abu Abdallah VI Muhammad was the twenty-sixth ruler of the Kingdom of Tlemcen. A member of the Zayyanid dynasty, he served as Emir twice, once in 1540, and again in 1543, during a power struggle with his brother Abu Zayyan IV. His brother eventually won power, and had Abdullah executed in 1544.

== Biography ==
=== First reign ===
Abu Muhammad II, the Emir of Tlemcen, had died in 1540, leaving behind his two sons as possible heirs: Abu Abdallah Muhammad and Abu Zayyan. The elder of the two, Abu Abdullah was proclaimed Emir under the name Abu Abdallah VI; however, he failed to secure the support of the Ottomans. Before long, various marabouts and sheikhs overthrew Abu Abdallah and replaced him with his brother Abu Zayyan IV. Abdallah VI thus had to flee to Oran, he would be received by the Count of Alcaudete. The governor of Oran promised to restore him to power and Abu Abdallah promised to recognize the suzerainty of the Spanish Crown if he regained the throne. Charles V approved these conditions and, in 1542, Count Alcaudete started the preparations for the campaign.

=== Campaign to restore him ===
After discutions, emperor Charles V consented to an operation to restore Abu Abdallah to the throne and a force consisting of a garrison of 1,000 soldiers and 400 Arabs was dispatched toward Tlemcen under the command of Alfonso de Martínez in January 1543. Although Abu Abdallah VI had assured the Spaniards that many would join his cause along the way, this did not happen. Abu Abdallah’s meager force encountered an army from Tlemcen that outnumbered his own tenfold. In the ensuing battle, all the Spaniards were killed and the few who managed to escape brought news of the defeat back to Spanish Oran.

Upon learning of the defeat, Charles V ordered another army to be sent, it departed immediately and arrived in Oran two days later. On January 27, Córdoba himself left the city at the head of an infantry of 14,000 and a cavalry of 500. He crossed the Isser River and advanced on Tlemcen. In the three-hour battle that followed, the Spaniards defeated Abu Zayyan IV's forces. This forced him to flee the city and to retreat into the Angad Desert.

=== Second reign ===
The Spaniards reached the gates of Tlemcen that same afternoon and the soldiers, eager to sack the city, disbanded, although the Count was able to rally the army again. After crossing the Saf-Saf bridge, they camped in some olive groves near the city walls and, on 6 February, the inhabitants opened the gates after Count Alcaudete promised them that they would not loot the city. The Count and his army went to collect the city's resources but the loot disappointed the Spaniards: most of it had been taken by the inhabitants who fled the city. Because of this, the Spanish broke their promise and sacked the city, killing and enslaving many of its inhabitants. The Spanish went to plunder other towns near Tlemcen and brought with them part of the population that had fled along with other 2,000 Jewish and Arab captives.

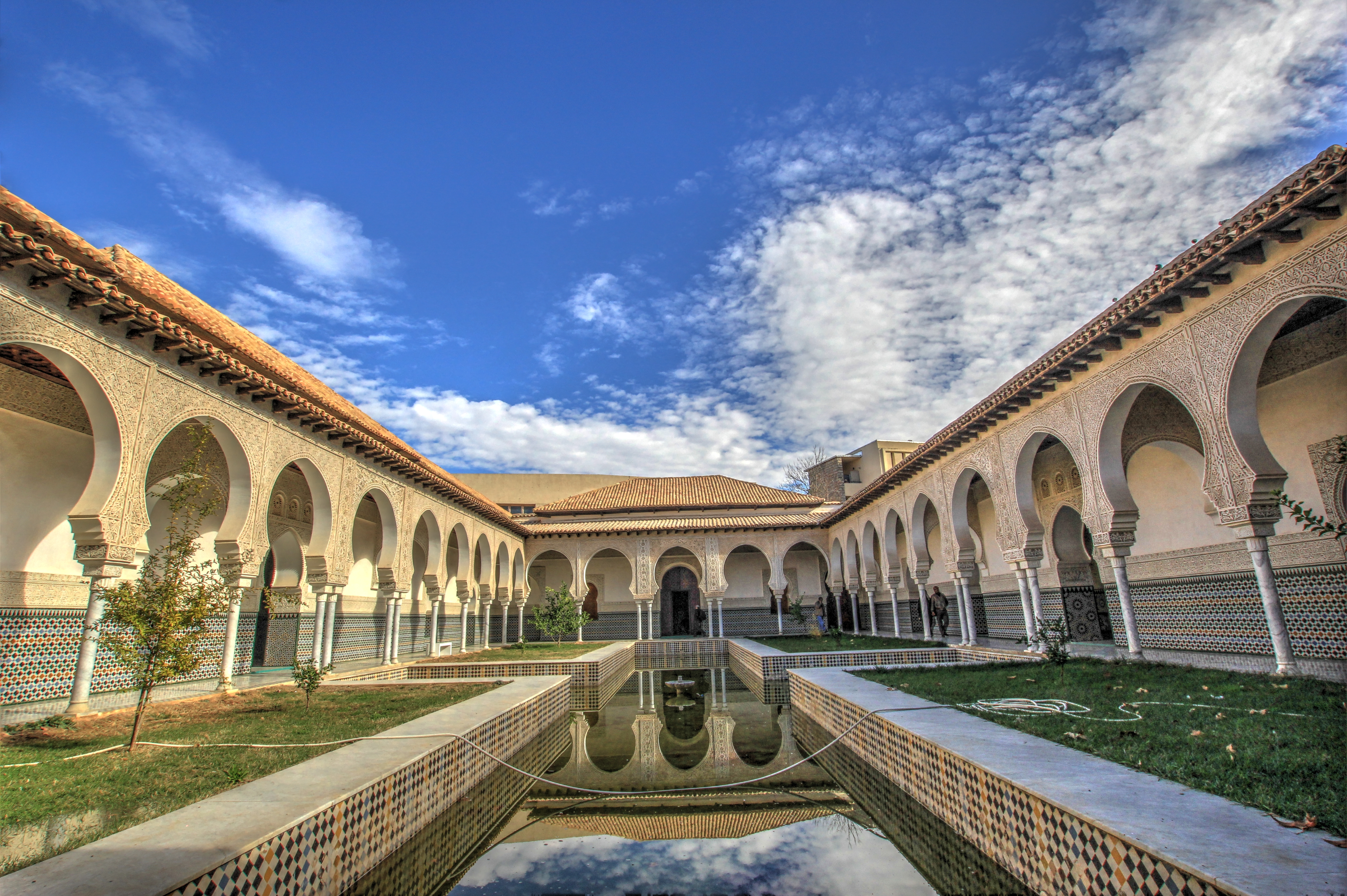
El Mechouar Palace in Tlemcen, where Abu Abdallah VI was proclaimed king.

Shortly after this, Abu Abdallah VI went to El Mechouar Palace of the city where he was proclaimed again king of Tlemcen. Although the Spanish caused many disturbances during the occupation and many notables of Tlemcen went to complain to the king, but he replied that "he had no obligations except to those who had returned him to power", which caused much discontent among the population that supported Abu Abdallah. Count Alcaudete, wanting to make sure that Abu Zayyan was not thinking of fighting again, sent Martín de Córdoba to lead a reconnaissance that reached the Zitoun wadi. On 7 February, many of the inhabitants of Tlemcen who supported Abu Zayyan returned to their city. Even Ibrahim, the commander of the deposed sultan, swore his loyalty to Abu Abdallah.

The long stay in Tlemcen had reportedly weakened the Spanish army, which had already suffered numerous casualties, so they began to prepare everything to return to Oran. Count Alcaudete considered leaving an army of 1,200 men to ensure Abdallah's power, but there are several reasons why he did not do so. On the one hand, he thought it would not be a good idea because there was still a possibility of being attacked on the way back, he also planned to make another expedition to Mostaganem and all his troops were needed for the campaign. It is also possible that Charles I ordered him to return as soon as possible to Oran because he needed part of his army.

The Spanish began to make preparations to leave and the Count ordered all the luggage to be collected. He also collected some campaign pieces that he found in the city's arsenal and the 4 cannons that he lost during his failed expedition to Mostaganem in 1535: they had to be repaired because they hadn't been used since then. The departure from the city was planned for 29 February but had to be postponed until the following day because the Arabs loyal to Abu Zayyan, who had been sent a challenge, negotiated as if they wanted to submit. Finally, the Spanish troops left the city on 1 March. The large number of captives caused concern among the officers, who suggested to the Count that they should be beheaded and the loot burned, but he rejected the idea, fearing to displease his army.

Finally, after 40 days of rest, the Spanish troops set off in pursuit of Abu Zayyan IV (who was said to be recruiting troops near the Moulouya River), but without success.

Also on February 26th, Count Alcaudete signed a treaty with Abu Abdallah VI by which the Tlemceni monarch recognized himself as a vassal and tributary of Charles I of Spain. According to the treaty, Abdallah had to pay annually 4,000 doubloons and numerous harnessed horses and falconets.

Following this, Abu Abdullah would be seen as a spanish puppet while Abu Zayyan IV's reputation as a hero persisted among his people. This enabled the brother to quickly gather thousands of new supporters in the western provinces around late 1543 or early 1544. He soon advanced on Tlemcen with an army and laid siege to the city. However, Abu Abdallah VI led his own forces out and defeated his brother’s army. Abu Abdallah VI even tried to pursue Abu Zayyan, but upon returning to the city, he found the gates closed against him in December 1543. During his absence, the nobility had staged a coup, so left without supporters, Abu Abdallah VI was forced to retreat toward Oran, while Abu Zayyan IV was invited into Tlemcen and crowned in January 1544.

=== Death and aftermath ===
After being overthrown Abu Abdallah had to flee again, but on his way to Oran, he was captured and executed on the orders of his brother.

Following this, the restored Abu Zayyan IV, in agreement with Hayreddin Barbarossa, declared himself a vassal of the Sublime Porte to thank them for their support. Consequently, the Ottoman Sultan Suleiman the Magnificent was acclaimed during Friday prayers.

== Sources ==
- Bargès, Jean Joseph Léandre (1887). Complément de l'histoire des Beni-Zeiyan, rois de Tlemcen, ouvrage du cheikh Mohammed Abd'al-Djalil al-Tenessy (in French). Paris: E. Leroux.
- Brill, E. J. (1993). E.J. Brill's First Encyclopaedia of Islam: 1913-1936. A - Bābā Beg. BRILL. ISBN 978-90-04-09787-2.
- Ruff, Paul (15 October 1998). "La campagne de Tlemcen (1543)". La domination espagnole à Oran sous le gouvernement du comte d'Alcaudete, 1534-1558 (in French). Editions Bouchène. pp. 74–101. ISBN 978-2-35676-083-8.
- Schreier, Joshua (16 May 2017). The Merchants of Oran: A Jewish Port at the Dawn of Empire. Stanford University Press. ISBN 978-1-5036-0216-8.
- de Vera, León Galindo (1884). Historia vicisitudes y política tradicional de España respecto de sus posesiones en las costas de África desde la monarquía gótica y en los tiempos posteriores á la restauración hasta el último siglo (in Spanish). University of Oxford Press.
