= Campaign of Tlemcen (1557) =

Military campaign against Tlemcen

Coordinates: 34°52′58″N 01°19′00″W

- Part of Conflicts between the Regency of Algiers and Morocco
Date	1557
Location	Tlemcen, Algeria
Result	Algerian victory

Belligerents
Saadi Sultanate	Regency of Algiers; Kingdom of Beni Abbas

Commanders and leaders
Mohammed ash-Sheikh	Hasan Pasha

Strength
30,000 horsemen 10,000 infantrymen 4,000 musketeers	6,000 musketeers 16,000 infantrymen

Casualties and losses
Heavy	Heavy
- Location of the battle of Tlemcen (1557) in Algeria.

The Campaign of Tlemcen or Tlemcen campaign was a military operation led by the Saadians of Mohammed ash-Sheikh against Tlemcen in 1557, then under the domination of the Regency of Algiers, a vassal state of the Ottoman Empire. Mohammed ash-Sheikh, who wanted to conquer Algeria, occupied the city but failed to seize the Mechouar Palace, which was defended by a garrison of 500 men under the command of Caïd Saffa.

== Background ==
In 1550, Mohammed ash-Sheikh launched an offensive against the Algerian presence in north-west Algeria. The Moroccans seized Tlemcen on June 9, 1550, but failed at Mostaganem and were then defeated by the Banu Amir tribe, allies of the Spaniards in Oran. The Ottomans retaliated in 1551, and launched a counter-attack with their Berber allies from the Kingdom of Beni Abbas and the pro-Ottoman Zayyanids. Defeated by Hassan Pasha's Turkish contingents, the Moroccan army abandoned Tlemcen.

Salah Raïs gathered an army in Tlemcen of Turkish harquebusiers and Berber soldiers from the kingdom of Kuku. They launched a campaign against Fez with the aim of enthroning Ali Abu Hassun, a Watassid pretender in exile. After heavy fighting near Fez, Mohammed ash-Sheikh was defeated and forced to abandon the city. Troops of the Regency of Algiers entered the city on January 9, 1554. Ali Abu Hassun removed some of the Turks who were guilty of acts of violence against the population, in exchange for a large sum of money that he had promised them, as well as the Peñón de Vélez de la Gomera base.

Mohammed ash-Sheikh reorganized his troops in the south and defeated Ali Abu Hassun in the battle of Tadla. This victory allowed him to re-seize the city of Fez on September 13, 1554, and to ascend the throne and establish definitively the Saadian dynasty in Morocco.

Mohammed ash-Sheikh made a request to both Madrid and Lisbon for the supply of military forces. The governor of Mazagan received a letter from King John III of Portugal and a truce was subsequently concluded in 1555.

== Battle ==
The Saadian sultan wanted to take advantage of the disorder that had reigned in the government of Algiers since the return of Hassan Corso. Moulay Mohammed El Mehdi, son of the Saadian sultan, marched on Tlemcen. The town was defended by a small garrison of the Algerian army commanded by the caïd Çafa. During the attack, the Algerian garrison entrenched itself in the citadel of the city and resisted all assaults while waiting for reinforcements from Algiers. The garrison under caïd Saffa consisted of only 500 men, he was forced to withdraw to the Casbah. It was impossible for the Saadians to capture the citadel as they had no artillery and therefore hastily dispatched an ambassador to Count Alcaudete in Oran to request artillery and ammunition.

As soon as he returned to Algiers, Algerian sultan Hasan Pacha assembled a powerful army. Alerted to this offensive, he marched to the aid of Tlemcen with his twenty-two thousand men. On hearing of his arrival, the frightened Moroccans crossed the border again, hotly pursued by the Algerian army which reached them under the walls of Fez.

A counter-battle under the walls of Fez took place. The city was defended by four thousand musketeers, thirty thousand horsemen and ten thousand infantrymen. This Algerian counter-attack, described as stubborn, caused many losses on both the Moroccan and Algerian sides. Hassan Pasha decided to return with his army to Tlemcen after being warned of a possible Spanish attack. For the bey of Algiers, the Saadians were not a problem as long as they did not cross the Moulouya river, which served as the border between Algeria and Morocco at the time.

== Aftermath ==
The Moroccan army ended its campaign when it learned that a Berber revolt had broken out in the Moroccan Atlas Mountains. Mohamed el Mehdi withdrew, leaving Caïd Mansour in place with his troops. Hassan, son of Hayreddin Barbarossa, who had returned at the head of the Regency of Algiers, defeated the Moroccans and launched an assassin, a certain Salah Kahia, to take revenge on Sultan Mohamed ash-Sheikh and his attempted alliance with the Spaniards. The head of Mohammed al-Shaykh was taken to the Casbah and hung at the entrance of the Bab Azoun before it was sent to Istanbul. Another failed Saadi expedition against Tlemcen occurred in 1560.
