= Aydın Reis =

Ottoman admiral

Aydın Reis (died 1535) was an Ottoman admiral, known to the Spanish as "Cachidiablo" and to the Italians as "Cacciadiavolo."

== Early years ==
He was a Turk from Kayseri, Central Anatolia (modern Turkey). In the late 15th century he was the subordinate of Kemal Reis, the most important sea man of the Ottoman Empire during the reign of Bayazid II. He took service under Ottoman Empire as a captain. He then worked in Egypt under Mamluk rule and after the death of Kemal Reis in 1511, he sailed to the Barbary coast (North West Africa) to attend the forces of Oruç Reis, an Ottoman privateer who had established his own state. He took part in the conquest of Algiers in 1516. After the death of Oruç Reis in 1518, Oruç's brother Hayreddin Barbarossa voluntarily accepted the suzerainty of the Ottoman sultan Selim I. So Aydın Reis returned to Ottoman service.

== Battle of Formentera ==
One of the most important projects of the Ottoman Empire in the early 16th century was evacuation and resettlement of some of the Muslims and Jews from the former Al Andalus lands after the defeat of the last Arab stronghold in Spain by Isabella I of Castile. Aydın Reis participated in this project and in 1529, in collaboration with Salih Reis, he began transferring Muslims from the port of Oliva, east Spain to Ottoman lands. But Spanish fleet chased them. So Aydın Reis landed the passagers on Balearic Islands and engaged and defeated the Spanish fleet near the isle Formentera. Rodrigo Portuondo, the commander of the Spanish fleet, died in the combat. History makes little mention of the day when Aydin Reis took on Spain's eight large war galleys with his much smaller fleet in a conflict which by all the rules of war, should have gone the other way, and defeated them (Ernle Bradford, "The Sultans Admiral").

== Later years ==
After the battle of Formentera, he was called to Constantinople to be rewarded by Sultan Suleiman the Magnificent. After Hayreddin Barbarossa was appointed as the admiral of the Ottoman navy, Aydın Reis was promoted to be the commander of the fleet in Algiers. He participated in the conquest Tunis in 1534 (to be lost to Spain the next year.) He died in Bone (modern Annaba, Algeria in 1535) from natural causes.
