= Sidi Abdelli =

Coordinates: 35°04′N 1°08′W

- Commune and town
- Interactive map of Sidi Abdelli
- Country: Algeria
- Province: Tlemcen Province
- Time zone: UTC+1 (CET)

Sidi Abdelli is a town and commune in Tlemcen Province in north-western Algeria.
