= Muhammad I Pasha =

Beylerbey of the Regency of Algiers

Muhammad Pasha Sultan

Beylerbey of Algiers
- In office 1566–1568
- Preceded by: Hasan Pasha
- Succeeded by: Occhiali

Personal details
- Born: Unknown
- Parent: Salah Rais (father)
- Occupation: Pasha of the Regency of Algiers
- Known for: Extending Algiers and building several forts

Muhammad Pasha was an Algerian Pasha of the Regency of Algiers from 1566. He was the son of the famous Pasha of Algiers Salah Rais. He was active in extending Algiers and building several forts. He was succeeded by Uluç Ali Reis, a famous pirate of Italian origins.

Preceded by Hasan Pasha	Pasha of Algiers; 1566–1568	Succeeded by Uluç Ali Reis
