= Muhammad Kurdogli =

Pasha of the Regency of Algiers from 1556

Muhammad Kurdogli was Pasha of the Regency of Algiers from 1556. He succeeded Salah Rais in the position when the latter died. He was assassinated in the Koubba of Sidi Abd-el-Kader soon after in 1557. He was succeeded by Youssef, who only ruled for 6 days.
