= Hasan Pasha (son of Barbarossa) =

Beylerbey of the Regency of Algiers (c. 1517–1572)

Hasan Pasha Sultan

Beylerbey of Algiers
- In office 1545–1566
- Preceded by: Hayreddin Barbarossa
- Succeeded by: Muhammad I Pasha

Personal details
- Born: c. 1517 Algiers
- Died: 4 July 1572 (aged 54–55) Constantinople, Ottoman Empire
- Children: Mahmut Bey

Military service
- Allegiance: Ottoman Algeria
- Years of service: c. 1545–1572
- Rank: Admiral٫ Kapudan pasha
- Battles/wars: Expedition to Mostaganem (1547); Battle of Tlemcen (1551); Battle of Tlemcen (1557); Expedition to Mostaganem (1558); Great Siege of Malta (1565); Ottoman–Venetian War (1570–1573)

Hasan Pasha (c. 1517 – 4 July 1572) was the son of Hayreddin Barbarossa and three-times Beylerbey of the Regency of Algiers. His mother was a Moorish woman from Algiers. He succeeded his father as ruler of Algiers, and replaced Barbarossa's deputy Hasan Agha, who had been effectively holding the position of ruler of Algiers since 1533.

== Ruler of Algiers ==
Hasan Pasha became ruler of Algiers when his father was called to Constantinople in 1545. Barbarossa died peacefully in the Ottoman capital in 1546.

In June 1545, Hasan Pasha occupied the city of Tlemcen, where he set a Turkish garrison, and put pro-Ottoman Sultan Muhammad on the throne, however Tlemcen was lost to the Spanish in 1547 who had captured the city. In 1548, he was replaced as Beylerbeyi of Algiers by the Ottoman Admiral Turgut Reis, who was nominated by Suleiman the Magnificent.

Hasan Pasha again became ruler of Algiers and defeated the Saadians in Tlemcen in an alliance with a local Kabyle Kingdom. He was recalled in 1552, on the reason that he was one of the causes of the conflict between the Turks and Morocco. He was replaced by Salah Rais, who nevertheless marched on Fez and captured the city in early 1554, when the Moroccan ruler Mohammed ash-Sheikh rejected cooperation with the Ottomans.

Hasan Pasha was again named beylerbey of Algiers in June 1557, in order to continue the fight against the Moroccan ruler, who had formed an alliance with the Spanish against the Ottomans. He fought another battle in Tlemcen against the Saadians and defeated them before having Mohammed ash-Sheikh assassinated in October 1557.

Hasan Pasha invaded Morocco in early 1558, but he was stopped by the Moroccan north of Fez at the Battle of Wadi al-Laban, and had to retreat upon hearing of Spanish preparations for an offensive from Oran. He reembarked from the port of Qassasa in northern Morocco, and from there returned to Algiers to prepare a defense against the Spaniards.

After the Ottoman victory in the Expedition of Mostaganem (1558), Hasan Pasha was recalled again to Constantinople, apparently because of conflicts with his troops.

He again became Beylerbey of Algiers in 1562, and led the unsuccessful Sieges of Oran and Mers El Kébir in 1563.

== Commander-in-Chief of the Ottoman Navy ==
In 1567, he was recalled to Istanbul and named, Kapudan pasha or Commander-in-Chief, of the Ottoman Navy. like his father before him.

Hasan Pasha was at the Great Siege of Malta in 1565, and Battle of Lepanto in 1571. He died in Constantinople in 1572.

== See also ==
- List of Pasha and Dey of Algiers
- History of Ottoman Algeria

== Sources ==
- Russell, Quentin (2021). Mediterranean Naval Battles That Changed the World. Pen and Sword Maritime. ISBN 9781526716026.

Preceded by Hayreddin Barbarossa	Pasha of Algiers; 1545–1552	Succeeded by Salah Rais
Preceded by Yahyia Pasha	Pasha of Algiers; 1557–1561	Succeeded by Ahmed Bostandji
Preceded by Ahmed Bostandji	Pasha of Algiers; 1562–1566	Succeeded by Muhammad I Pasha
