= Salah Rais =

Ottoman Empire admiral

- 7th King of Algiers

King of Algiers
- Reign: 1552–1556
- Predecessor: Hasan Pasha
- Successor: Muhammad Kurdogli
- Born: c. 1488; Alexandria, Egypt
- Died: c. 1568; Algiers, Algeria
- Issue: Muhammad I Pasha
- Kingdom: Algiers
- Religion: Islam

Salah Rais (Arabic: صالح ريس) (c. 1488 – 1568) was the 7th King of Algiers, an Ottoman privateer. He is alternatively referred to as Sala Reis, Salih Rais, Salek Rais and Cale Arraez in several European sources, particularly in Spain, France and Italy.

In 1529, together with Aydın Reis, he took part in the Turkish-Spanish battle near the Isle of Formentera, during which the Ottoman forces destroyed the Spanish fleet, whose commander, Rodrigo de Portuondo, died in combat.

In 1538 he commanded the right wing of the Turkish fleet at the naval Battle of Preveza, where the Ottoman forces under Barbarossa Hayreddin Pasha defeated the Holy League of Charles V under the command of Andrea Doria.

In 1551, due to his success in the conquest of Tripoli (Libya) together with Turgut Reis and Sinan Pasha, he was promoted to the rank of Pasha and became the Beylerbeyi (Ottoman equivalent of Grand Duke) of Algiers and the Bahriye Beylerbeyi (Admiral) of the Ottoman West Mediterranean Fleet.

== Background and early career ==
Salah Reis was born in Alexandria in Ottoman Egypt or Kazdağ near Çanakkale and was of Turkish, Egyptian, Arab or Moorish origin.

At a very young age he joined the fleet of Oruç Reis (Aruj Barbarossa), the most famous of the Ottoman corsairs and privateers from Anatolia who sought fortune in the West Mediterranean by operating from their bases on the Barbary Coast. He gained experience in seamanship as a crew member of the Barbarossa brothers, Oruç Reis and Hızır Reis, and soon became one of their chief lieutenants.

Salah Rais was around 30 years old when Oruç Reis died in 1518 during a battle against the Spaniards in Algeria. From 1518 onwards, he joined the fleet of Hızır Reis, who inherited the title of Barbarossa from his older brother, Baba Oruç (Father Aruj).

In 1520 he went to Djerba together with Hızır Reis and Turgut Reis, and later that year assaulted Bône, which was under Spanish control.

== Career in the Ottoman Navy ==
In 1529, commanding a force of 14 galliots, Salah Rais assaulted the Gulf of Valencia before joining the fleet of Aydın Reis which took part in the Turkish-Spanish War near the Isle of Formentera, where the Ottoman forces destroyed the Spanish fleet, whose commander, Rodrigo de Portuondo, died in combat. During the war, Salah Rais captured the galley of Captain Tortosa and took the son of Admiral Portundo, the Spanish commander, as a prisoner of war.

The Ottoman Sultan Suleiman the Magnificent summoned Barbarossa to Constantinople, who set sail in August 1532, with Salah Rais as an officer in his fleet. Having raided Sardinia, Bonifacio in Corsica, the Islands of Montecristo, Elba and Lampedusa, the fleet captured 18 galleys near Messina and learned from the captured prisoners that Andrea Doria, the Genoese admiral in the service of the Emperor Charles V, was on his way to Preveza. Barbarossa proceeded to raid the nearby coasts of Calabria and then sailed towards Preveza. Doria's forces fled after a short battle, but only after Barbarossa, accompanied by Salah Rais and Murat Reis, had captured seven of their galleys. Barbarossa arrived at Preveza with a total of 44 galleys, but sent 25 of them back to Algiers and headed to Constantinople with 19 ships, one of which was commanded by Salah Rais, who, along with Murat Reis, was one of the 19 men received by Suleiman the Magnificent at Topkapı Palace. Suleiman appointed Barbarossa Kaptan-ı Derya (Admiral of the Fleet) of the Ottoman Navy and Beylerbeyi (Governor General) of North Africa. Barbarossa was also given the government of the Sanjak (Province) of Rhodes and those of Euboea and Chios in the Aegean Sea. Salah Rais, on the other hand, was promoted to the rank of Commodore.

In 1533 Barbarossa and Salah Rais operated together against the Spanish-controlled ports in the Mediterranean Sea.

In July 1535 Salah Rais was appointed by Barbarossa Hayreddin Pasha for the task of defending Tunis. Accompanied by Cafer Reis and very few Turkish soldiers, Salah Rais encountered the forces of Girolamo Tuttavilla, Count of Sarno, whose fortress was near the city walls of La Goulette. Salah Rais pretended to retreat and eventually routed and trapped the forces of Tuttavilla, who followed him. Tuttavilla was killed in combat, and his fortress was captured by the Turks. Still in July 1535, Salah Rais assisted Hasan Reis (later Hasan Pasha), the son of Barbarossa, in governing Algiers. In 1536 Barbarossa and Salah Rais were called back to Constantinople to take command of the Ottoman naval attack on the Habsburg Kingdom of Naples. In July 1537 the Turks landed at Otranto and captured the city, as well as the Fortress of Castro and the city of Ugento in Apulia.

In August 1537, Lütfi Pasha and Barbarossa led a huge Ottoman force, in which Salah Rais also took part, that captured the Aegean and Ionian islands belonging to the Republic of Venice, namely Syros, Aegina, Ios, Paros, Tinos, Karpathos, Kasos and Naxos. In the same year Barbarossa captured Corfu from Venice and once again raided Calabria. These losses caused Venice to ask Pope Paul III to organize a Holy League against the Ottomans.

== Battle of Preveza ==
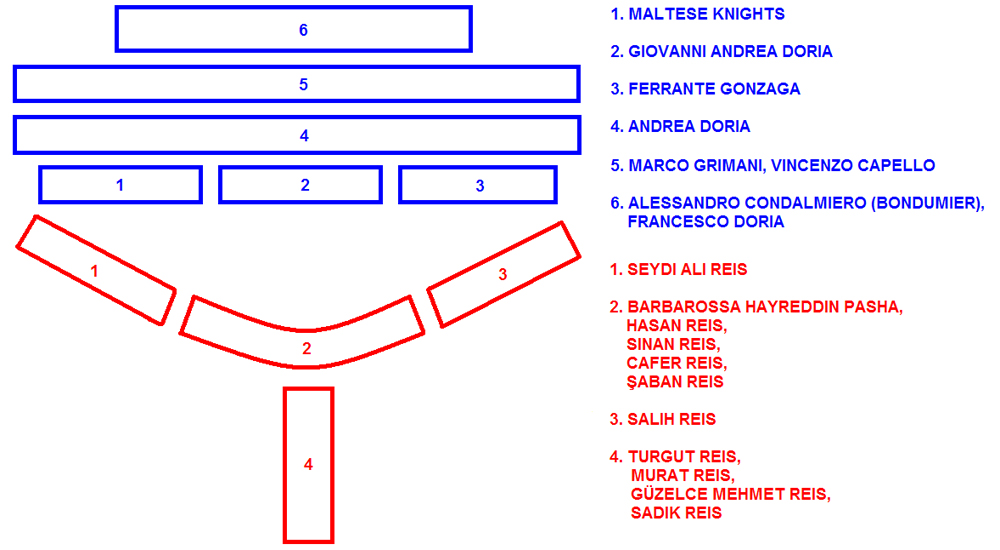
Salah Rais commanded the right wing of the Turkish fleet at the naval Battle of Preveza in 1538

In February 1538, Pope Paul III succeeded in assembling a Holy League (comprising the Papacy, Spain, the Holy Roman Empire, the Republic of Venice and the Maltese Knights) against the Ottomans, which was to be commanded by Andrea Doria, the chief admiral of Charles V, Holy Roman Emperor.

Salah Rais, now a Bahriye Sancakbeyi (Rear Admiral, Upper Half) commanded the 24 galleys which formed the right wing of the Ottoman fleet during the Battle of Preveza in September 1538, in which the numerically inferior Turkish forces of Barbarossa Hayreddin Pasha won an overwhelming victory over the Holy League under the command of Andrea Doria. In one of the most famous incidents of the battle, Salah Rais and his men boarded and assaulted the Galeone di Venezia (Galleon of Venice), the huge Venetian flagship under the command of Alessandro Condalmiero (Bondumier), together with two other Venetian galleys which were drifted away from the rest of the Venetian fleet due to the heavy loss of oarsmen which resulted from the bitter fighting.

== Recapture of Castelnuovo and the conquest of Venetian islands in the Aegean ==
In June 1539 Salah Rais set sail from Constantinople with 20 galleys, and near Cape Maleo joined the fleet of Barbarossa which was appointed with the mission of recapturing Castelnuovo (Herceg Novi) from the Venetians. On the way to Castelnuovo their combined fleet captured the islands of Skiathos, Skyros, Andros and Serifos from the Venetians. In August 1539 Barbarossa Hayreddin Pasha, Turgut Reis and Salah Rais laid siege to Castelnuovo and took the city back. They also captured the nearby Castle of Risan and later assaulted the Venetian fortress of Cattaro and the Spanish fortress of Santa Veneranda near Pesaro. The Turkish fleet later took the remaining Christian outposts in the Ionian and Aegean Seas. Venice finally signed a peace treaty with Sultan Suleiman the Magnificent in October 1540, agreeing to recognize the Turkish territorial gains and to pay 300,000 gold ducats.

== Operations on the French coast and Catalonia ==
According to some Turkish resources, in 1540, Salah Rais was together with Turgut Reis in Girolata, Corsica, where the two were captured by the combined forces of Giannettino Doria (Andrea Doria's nephew), Giorgio Doria and Gentile Virginio Orsini while repairing their ships at the harbour. These sources also mention that Salah Rais and Turgut Reis were both forced to become oar slaves in Genoese ships until they were liberated by Barbarossa Hayreddin Pasha in 1544, who threatened to attack the port of Genoa with his massive fleet of 210 ships.

French, Italian and Spanish sources, however, acknowledge the captivity (1540) and liberation (1544) of Turgut Reis, but make no mention of the captivity of Salah Rais. It is probable that the close friendship between Salah Rais and Turgut Reis and their numerous joint operations may have possibly caused a confusion.

In fact, according to French, Italian and Spanish sources, Salah Rais took part in the Franco-Ottoman conquest of Nice (Nizza) on 5 August 1543, which was commanded by Barbarossa Hayreddin Pasha. According to the same sources, following the conquest of Nice, Salah Rais commanded the Ottoman force of 20 galleys and 3 fustas which assaulted the Costa Brava in Catalonia, Spain, in that same year. In early October 1543, Salah Rais landed his troops at Rosas and sacked the city. The following day, Salah Rais appeared at the Medas Islands (Illes Medes) about 1 km off the coast of L'Estartit, before proceeding to Palafrugell and Palamós, the latter being severely sacked following a fierce battle for its capture. From there Salah Rais proceeded to the nearby San Juan de Palamós, which was likewise sacked, and captured the Spanish galley Bribona off the coast of Calelh, a fishing village in the area. He later landed his troops at Empúries (Ampurias) and Cadaqués, capturing and sacking both cities, before sailing to Algiers. He was spotted sailing together with Barbarossa in the spring of 1544.

== Operations in Sicily, Malta and the West Mediterranean ==
In mid June 1548 Salah Rais appeared at Capo Passero in Sicily with a force of 18 ships, before appearing at Gozo in Malta with 12 ships – having sent 6 of his ships to Algiers where they would join Turgut Reis, upon the order that he received from Hüseyin Çelebi.

In the Autumn of 1550 Andrea Doria contacted Salah Rais and attempted to convince him for serving Spain instead of the Ottoman Empire, but failed.

== Conquest of Tripoli (Libya) and subsequent promotion to the rank of Bahriye Beylerbeyi of Algiers ==
In June–August 1551, Salah Rais joined the fleet of Sinan Pasha and Turgut Reis, and played an important role in the conquest of Tripoli (Libya), which had been a possession of the Knights of St. John since 1530, when it was given to them by Charles V of Spain. He bombarded the fortress of the Knights from a distance of approximately 150 steps, eventually forcing Gaspare de Villers, their commander, to surrender. Salah Rais returned to Constantinople, where, due to his success in the conquest of Tripoli, he was promoted to the rank of Bahriye Beylerbeyi (Admiral) of the Ottoman West Mediterranean Fleet and was appointed as the Beylerbeyi (the Ottoman equivalent of Grand Duke) of Algiers in 1551.

In April 1552 he reached Algiers, and later set sail towards Sicily, where he captured a Maltese ship. In the summer of 1552, he joined the forces of Turgut Reis who landed at the Gulf of Naples, and together with him later assaulted the coasts of Lazio and Tuscany. From there Salah Rais sailed to Marseille, before capturing and sacking the island of Mallorca.

In 1552 or 1553 he defeated a Portuguese fleet in the Battle of Velez and seized the Penon de Velez. Following this victory, he agreed to help the Wattasid ruler reconquer Fez.

== Marching overland to the Sahara Desert (1552) ==
From Mallorca he sailed back to Algiers, where he prepared his troops to march overland to the Sahara Desert and expand the Ottoman Vilayet (Province) of Algeria inwards. The troops advanced south and captured the city of Touggourt, built around an oasis in southern Algeria. From there the Turks marched towards Ouargla, finding a ghost city whose inhabitants fled upon hearing their arrival.

== Reestablishment of the Wattassid King in Fez ==
In 1549, the new ruler of Morocco, Mohammed ash-Sheikh successfully ousted the Wattasid sultan Ali Abu Hassun, the latter ruled only over Fez and its region and had just declared himself a vassal of the Ottomans. ash-Sheikh even captured Tlemcen ending the Abdelwadid dynasty rule over the city. He was now advancing further east in Algeria and attacked the Ottoman Turks. This triggered an Ottoman counterattack, who recaptured Tlemcen in 1552 and advanced to Fez where they reestablished the Wattasid king Ali Abu Hassun in 1554, in turn he rewarded them with the port of "Badis" on the Mediterranean coast, which had been previously captured from the Spanish in 1522. But this lasted only a few months as in September 1554, Mohammed ash-Sheikh recaptured Fez and defeated Abu Hassun and his Ottoman allies, in the battle of Tadla.

== Return to Algeria ==
In 1555 the French Navy, then allied with the Ottoman Empire of Suleiman the Magnificent, sent a detachment to Algiers to ask the assistance of Salah Rais against the Spaniards. Salah Rais accepted the request and conceded 22 of his galleys, carrying Turkish soldiers and cannons, to the service of the French fleet. Later, with his remaining force of 40,000 men, he laid siege to Bougie. After 14 days of continuous artillery bombardment, he destroyed the two main defenses of the city walls: the Fortress of Vergelette which controlled the entrance of the port, and the Spanish castle which stood right in front of the city walls. The Spanish Governor of Bougie, Alfonso di Peralta, decided to make peace with Salah Rais instead of continuing to defend the city until the bitter end. According to the pact, the Turks allowed all the surviving Spanish inhabitants of Bougie to safely return to Spain with their belongings, and the Spanish forces to take away their cannons and weapons. However, even though the Governor, Alfonso di Peralta, could sail safely to Valencia, together with 20 of his high-ranking officials, on a French ship, some of the Spanish civilians (around 400 men, 120 women and 100 children) were captured and enslaved by the corsairs operating in the area. Alfonso di Peralta was arrested as soon as he entered the port of Valencia and Charles V ordered his execution for treason, which took place in a public square of Valladolid.

Later that year, Salah Rais conquered Peñón de Vélez de la Gomera from the Spaniards, before sailing to Constantinople where he was received by the Sultan.

== Sieges of Oran, 1556 and 1563 ==
In 1556 he left Constantinople and set sail towards the Spanish stronghold of Oran in Algeria, which he assaulted with a force of 30 galleys. He destroyed the Spanish forts defending the entrance of the port, but could not capture the city itself due to the fierce resistance by the local population as well as the Spanish army garrison. He then retreated his fleet to Algiers.

In April 1563, commanding a force of 10,000 soldiers, he once again laid siege to Oran and Mers-el-Kébir, this time also with the assistance of Turgut Reis who supported him with a force of 20 ships and 20 pieces of siege artillery. Oran once again defended itself to the bitter end, until it was saved by a large Spanish force which arrived in June, but the Turks bombarded and destroyed the Fortress of Mers-el-Kébir.

== Siege of Malta, 1565 ==
In August 1565 Salah Rais took part in the Turkish Siege of Malta and commanded a force of 15,000 soldiers which attacked Fort Saint Michael. Towards the end of August he managed to set up a powerful mine which breached the walls of Castiglia, and attacked the bastion with 4,000 men. In the meantime, Lala Kara Mustafa Pasha commanded the main attack against Fort Saint Michael, until he was almost killed by a cannon fire which severely wounded him. Salah Rais then took his place and placed his troops around the ruins of the Bastion of Castiglia. The Turks managed to capture Fort Saint Elmo on the main island, but at the cost of too many casualties, including the famous Turgut Reis who was 80 years old when he died in Malta, shortly before the capture of Fort Saint Elmo. The siege was eventually lifted when a large Christian fleet that was assembled to support the Maltese Knights reached the island.

== Death in Algiers, 1568 ==
The Siege of Malta was also the final mission of Salah Rais, who was around 77 years old at that time. He died in Algiers 3 years later, in 1568, close to the age of 80, just like his lifelong friend Turgut Reis.

Turgutlu and Salihli are two neighbouring town centers within the Province of Manisa in the Aegean Region of Turkey.

== Legacy ==
Salah Rais was from the generation of great Turkish seamen in the 16th century such as Kemal Reis, Oruç Reis, Barbarossa Hayreddin Pasha, Turgut Reis, Kurtoğlu Muslihiddin Reis, Piri Reis, Piyale Pasha, Murat Reis and Seydi Ali Reis.

He played an important role in the Battle of Preveza (1538) which secured the Turkish domination of the Mediterranean during his lifetime, until the Battle of Lepanto (1571) which took place 3 years after his death.

He vastly enlarged the Ottoman territories in northwestern Africa and extended them to the coasts of the Atlantic Ocean.

Several warships of the Turkish Navy have been named after Salah Rais.

== See also ==
- Ottoman Navy

== Sources ==
- E. Hamilton Currey, Sea-Wolves of the Mediterranean, London, 1910
- Bono, Salvatore: Corsari nel Mediterraneo (Corsairs in the Mediterranean), Oscar Storia Mondadori. Perugia, 1993.
- Corsari nel Mediterraneo: Condottieri di ventura. Online database in Italian, based on Salvatore Bono's book.
- Bradford, Ernle, The Sultan's Admiral: The life of Barbarossa, London, 1968.
- Wolf, John B., The Barbary Coast: Algeria under the Turks, New York, 1979; ISBN 0-393-01205-0
- The Ottomans: Comprehensive and detailed online chronology of Ottoman history in English.
- Comprehensive and detailed online chronology of Ottoman history in Turkish.
- Turkish Navy official website: Historic heritage of the Turkish Navy (in Turkish)
