= Battle of Algiers (1541) =

Attack by the Holy Roman Empire on the kingdom of Algiers

- Part of Spanish–Ottoman wars and the Ottoman–Habsburg wars
- Siege of Algiers in 1541 (1542) Cornelis Anthonisz
Date	October–November 1541
Location	Algiers
Result	Algerian victory

Belligerents
Empire of Charles V: Holy Roman Empire; Spain; (Kingdom of Naples) Naples; Sicily; (Sovereign Military Order of Malta) Order of Saint John; Republic of Genoa; Papal States; Kingdom of Kuku	Regency of Algiers

Commanders and leaders
Charles V Navy: Andrea Doria; Army: Duke of Alba; Including: Ferrante I Gonzaga (Spain) Alfonso d'Avalos (Republic of Genoa) Giannettino Doria (Spain) Bernardino de Mendoza (Sovereign Military Order of Malta) Nicolas Durand de Villegaignon	Hasan Agha

Strength
65 galleys 450 transport ships including: 12,000 sailors 24,000 soldiers Including: 100 transports (Spain) 50 galleys (Spain) 100 transports (Republic of Genoa) 14 galleys (Papal States) 8 galleys (Kingdom of Naples) 150 transports (Sovereign Military Order of Malta) 400 knights 2,000 troops	1,500–2,000 Janissaries; 6,000–8,000 Andalusi and Maghrebi Moors

Casualties and losses
300 officers killed 8,000–12,000 killed 150 ships sunk	200 killed

The 1541 battle of Algiers occurred when Charles V of the Holy Roman Empire and king of Spain attempted to lead an amphibious attack against the Regency of Algiers. Inadequate planning, particularly against unfavourable weather, led to the failure of the expedition.

== Background ==
Algiers had been under the control of the Ottoman emperor Suleiman the Magnificent since its help in 1529 by Hayreddin Barbarossa. Barbarossa had left Algiers in 1535 to be named High Admiral of the Ottoman Empire in Constantinople, and was replaced as governor by Hasan Agha, a Sardinian eunuch and renegade. Hassan had in his service the well-known Ottoman naval commanders Dragut, Sālih Reïs, and Sinān Pasha.

Charles V made considerable preparations for the expedition, wishing to obtain revenge for the recent siege of Buda. However, the Spanish and Genoese fleets were severely damaged by a storm, forcing him to abandon the venture.

== Expedition ==
Charles V embarked very late in the season, on 28 September 1541, delayed by troubles in Germany and Flanders. The fleet was assembled in the Bay of Palma, at Majorca. It had more than 500 sails and 24,000 soldiers. A fleet led by Andrea Doria was dispatched with the help of allied nations including the Republic of Genoa, the Kingdom of Naples, and the Order of Saint John of Jerusalem to transport the troops from Spain and the Netherlands.

After enduring difficult weather, the fleet only arrived in front of Algiers on 19 October as a storm formed. Distinguished Spanish commanders accompanied Charles V on this expedition, including Hernán Cortés, the conqueror of Mexico, though he was never invited to the War Council.

Troops were disembarked on 23 October, and Charles established his headquarters on a land promontory surrounded by German troops. German, Spanish, and Italian troops, accompanied by 150 Knights of Malta, began to land while repelling Algerine opposition, soon surrounding the city, except for the northern part. Hayreddin's deputy Hassan Agha had a strong defence at the gate of Bab Azzoun and caused serious casualties among the Maltese knights.

The fate of the city seemed to be sealed; however, the following day the weather became severe, with heavy rain. Many galleys lost their anchors, and 15 were wrecked onshore. Another 33 carracks sank, while many more were dispersed. As more troops attempted to land, the Algerines started to make sorties, attacking the newly arrived. Charles V was surrounded, and only saved by the resistance of the Knights Hospitaller.

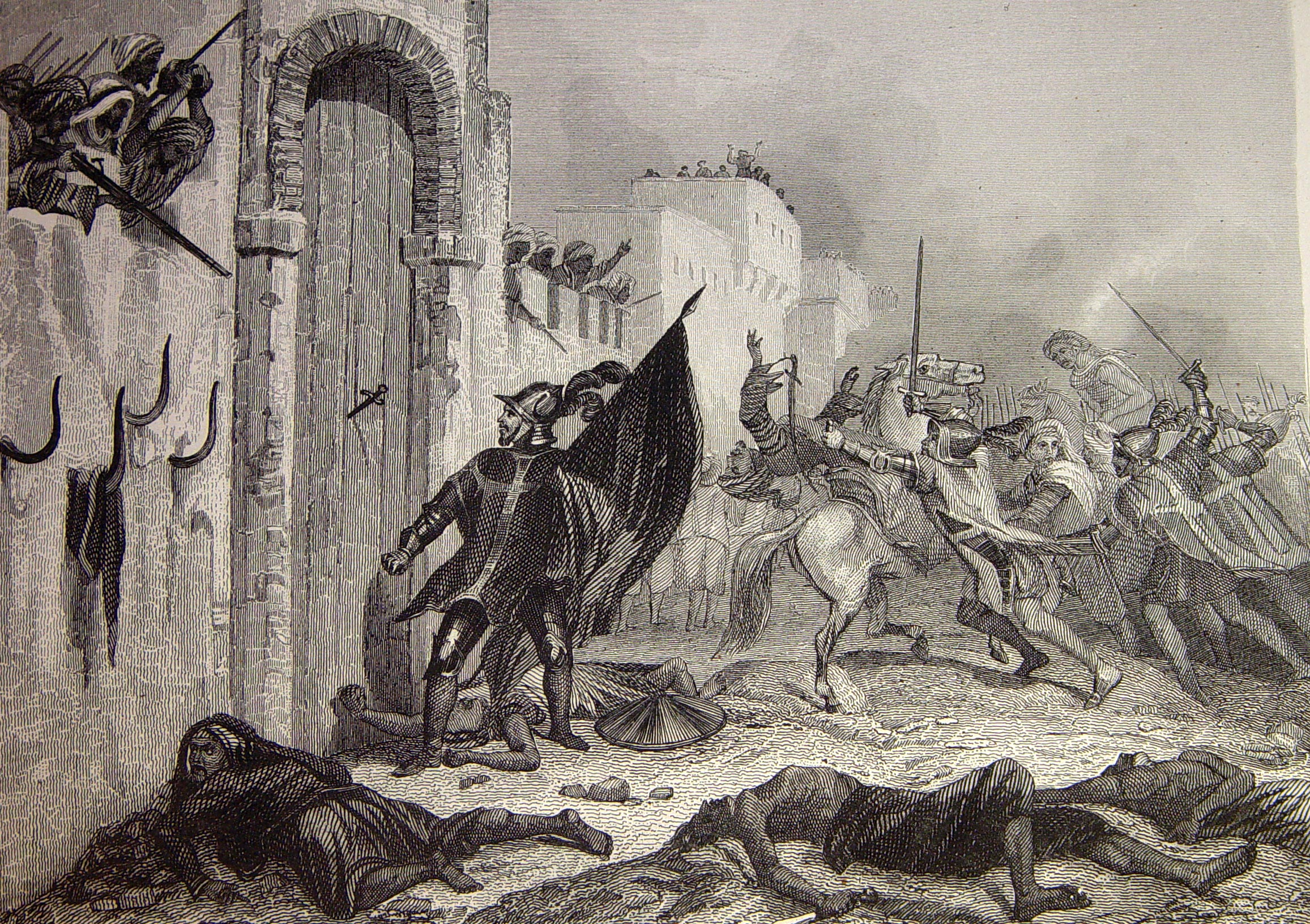
A Maltese knight thrusts his dagger into the gate of Bab Azzoun, by Léon Galibert (1844)

Andrea Doria managed to find a safer harbour for the remainder of the fleet at Cape Matifu, five miles east of Algiers. He enjoined Charles V to abandon his position and join him in Matifu, which Charles V did with great difficulty. From there, still oppressed by the weather, the remaining troops sailed to Béjaïa, still a Spanish harbour at that time. Charles could not depart for the open sea until 23 November. Throwing his horses and crown overboard, Charles abandoned his army and sailed home. He finally reached Cartagena, in southeast Spain, on 3 December.

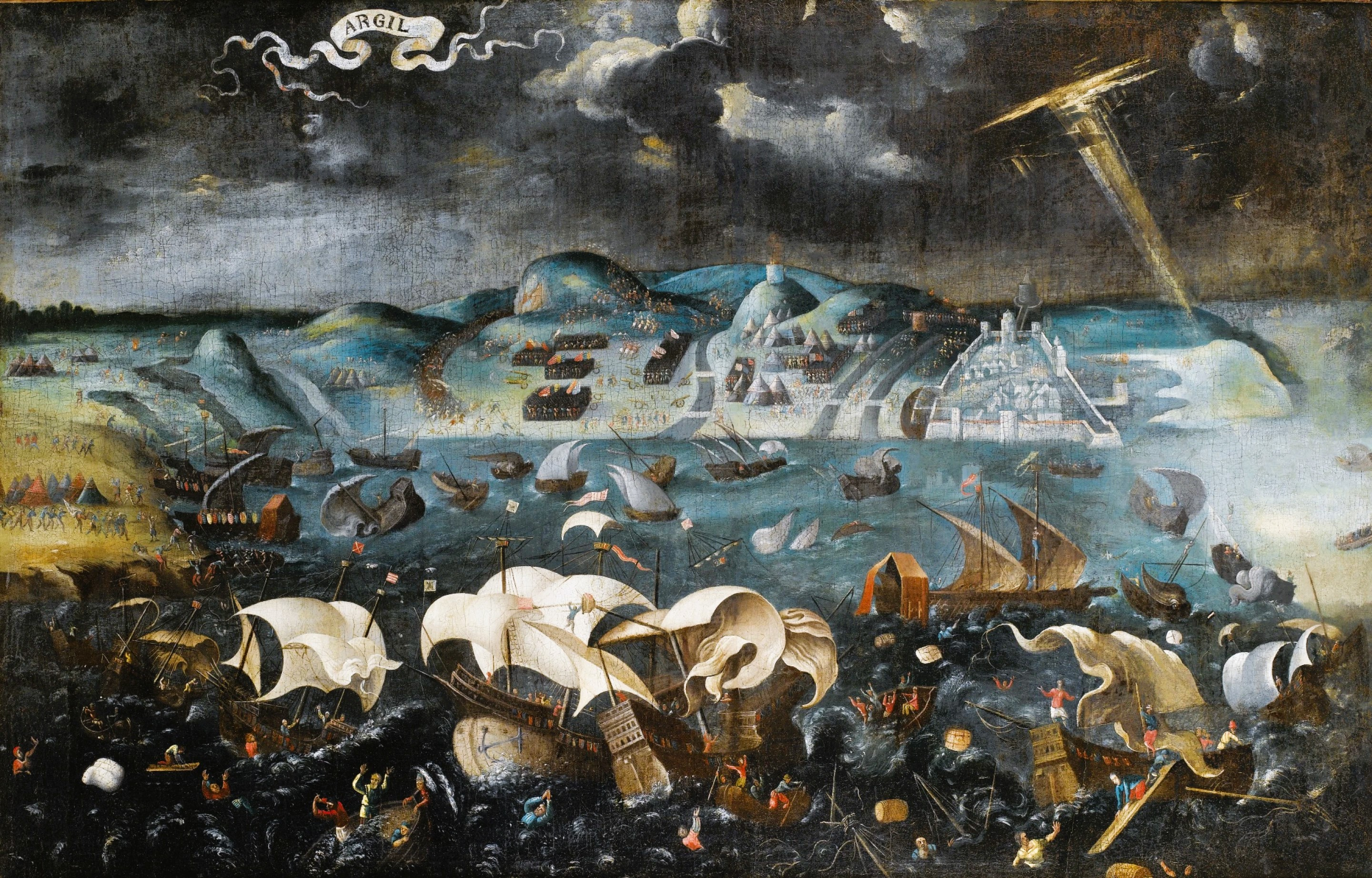
Shipwreck of Christian ships in the bay of Algiers, 1541

Losses amongst the invading force were heavy with 150 ships lost and large numbers of sailors and soldiers. A Turkish chronicler wrote that the Berber tribes massacred 12,000 invaders. Leaving war materiel, including 100 to 200 guns which were recovered for the ramparts of Algiers, Charles' army was taken prisoner in such numbers that it was said the markets of Algiers were filled with slaves; so much that in 1541, it was said they were being sold for an onion per head. Hasan Agha was rewarded with the title of Beylerbey for his exploits over the Christian forces.

== Chronology ==
The chronology of the expedition reconstructed by Daniel Nordman.

- October 18, 1541: departure of the expedition from Majorca;
- October 19: arrival of the expedition in sight of Algiers;
- October 20: At 7 a.m., the fleet is in the harbor of Algiers. At 3 p.m. the sea swells, Charles V's fleet takes shelter near Cape Matifou and the Spanish fleet at Cape Caxine;
- October 21: the fleet remains under cover;
- October 22: the fleet still in shelter but reconnaissance of the beach and water supply;
- 23 October: return of the Spanish fleet, landing of Spanish, then Italian and German troops (Charles V is ashore at 9 a.m.). Installation of the camp in Hamma. Night attack by the Algerians;
- October 24: Installation of Charles V's headquarters at Koudiat es-Saboun. Beginning of the fighting. The storm rises around 9 p.m.;
- October 25: storm, Algerian sortie, combat of Ras Tafoura. The storm increases in power destroying part of the fleet with provisions and war material, the rest will take shelter at Cape Matifou;
- October 26: the storm lasts, Charles V is on the shore, the retreat is decided (the horses are slaughtered) along the sea to the Knis wadi;
- October 27: retreat to Wadi El-Harrach;
- October 28: crossing of the overflowing wadi;
- October 29: retreat continues to Cape Matifou and gathering of forces;
- October 30: reconstitution of the forces with rest, council of war and repair of the fleet;
- 31 October: beginning of the re-embarkation of Italian troops;
- 1 November: re-embarkation of Charles V and German troops;
- 2 November: re-embarkation of Spanish troops. The sea is growing again;
- November 3: navigation in the storm;
- November 4: landing of Charles V at Bejaïa. Dispersal of the remains of the expedition fleet for Spain, Majorca and Sardinia;
- 5 November: arrival of the last five boats in Bejaïa.

== Aftermath ==
The disaster considerably weakened the Spanish, and Hassan Agha took the opportunity to attack Mers-el-Kebir, the harbour of the Spanish base of Oran, in July 1542.

Charles Lamb suggests that this storm may have influenced Shakespeare's character, the sea witch Sycorax in The Tempest. Sycorax, an Algerian sorceress, was banished from her homeland for wreaking havoc with her witchcraft, but was spared execution "for one thing she did". This elusive "one thing" is never stated; however Charles Lamb suggests that Shakespeare drew upon the legend of an unnamed Algerian witch who summoned a ferocious tempest which destroyed the 1541 invasion fleet, and it was this act of defending her nation which prevented her people from executing her.

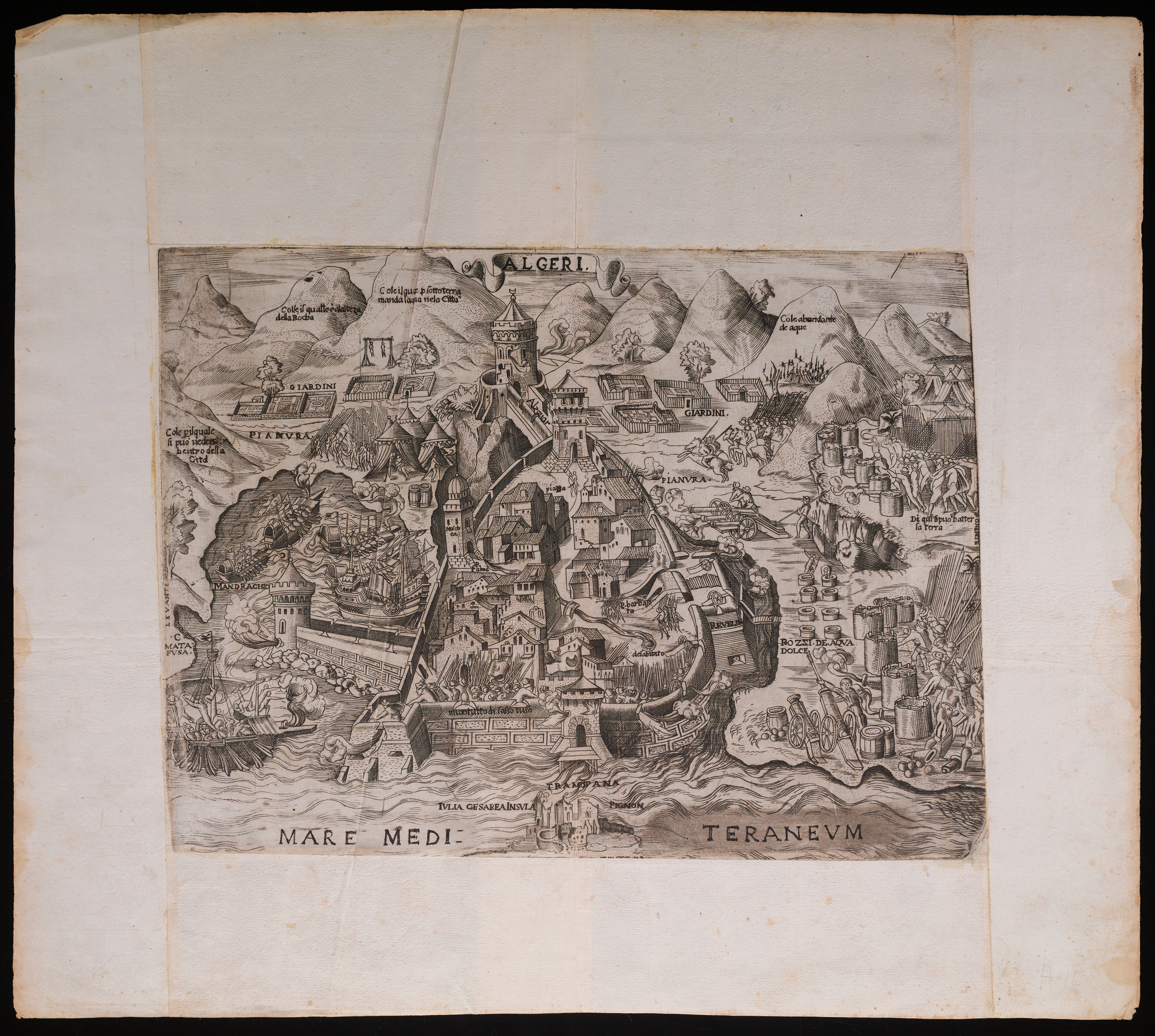
Algeri. 1541

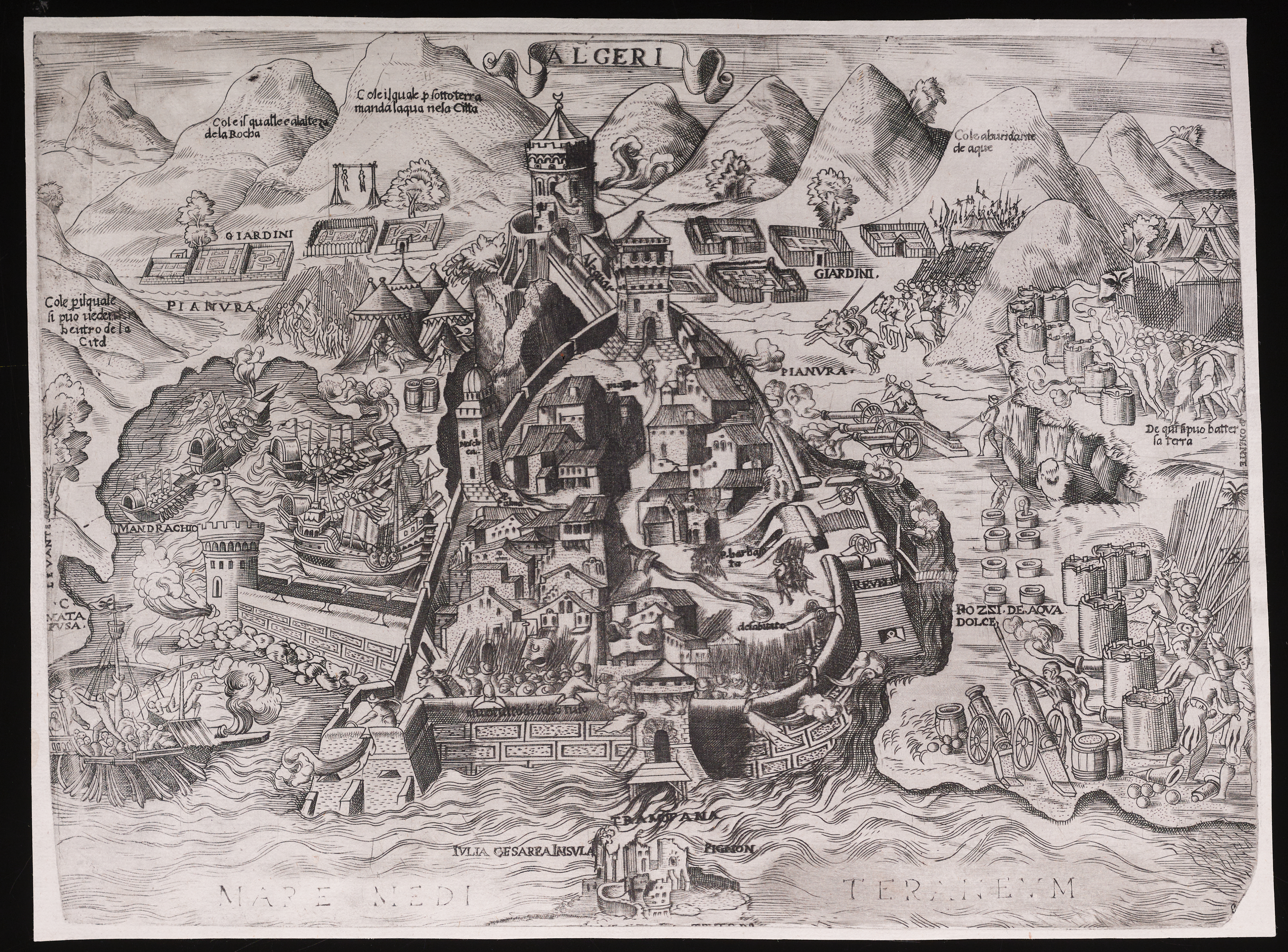
Algeri

== See also ==
- Algiers Expedition (1516)
- Algiers Expedition (1519)
