= Hasan Agha =

Ottoman regent of Algiers from 1533 to 1545

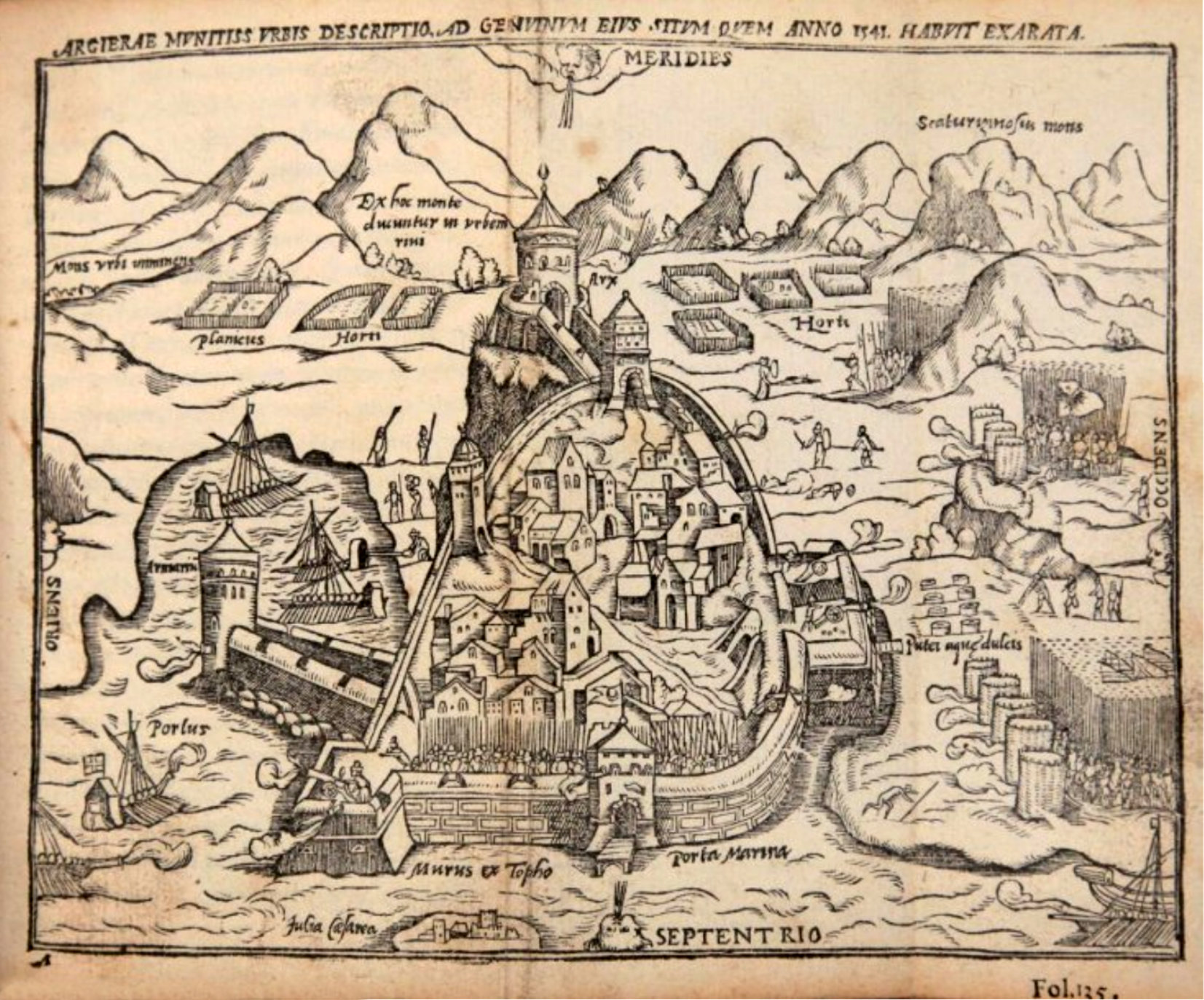
- Hasan Agha led the defense of Algiers in 1541 (1555 engraving).
- Born: Sardinia
- Died: Algeria
- Occupation: Governor of Ottoman Algeria
- Years active: 1532–1544
- Known for: Defence of Algeria against Charles V, Holy Roman Emperor and Andrea Doria

Hasan Agha (fl. 1532–1545) was a Sardinian renegade and effective ruler of the Regency of Algiers from 1533 to 1545.

He was born in Siniscola, Sardinia, where he was captured as a boy by the Algerian corsairs. He was the first cousin of another Sardinian renegade, Alcaide Alì. He became a slave of Hayreddin Barbarossa who freed him, and from then, his career led him to become one of Hayreddin's most trusted men. As his assistant and later lieutenant, Hayreddin left him in command when he had to leave for Constantinople in 1533. Hasan Agha ruled Algiers until 1545, as Barbarossa continued to be based in Constantinople as commander-in-chief of the Ottoman fleet and waged his campaigns in Tunisia.

Hasan Agha was the commander of Algiers during the 1541 Algiers expedition, in which Barbarossa was absent and which ended with catastrophic results for Charles V.

In 1542, he besieged the Zwawa tribe, who had supplied Charles V with 2,000 troops.

Upon the retirement of Barbarossa in 1544, the son of Barbarossa Hasan Pasha was appointed Governor of Algiers to replace his father, and thus also replace Hasan Agha in the position of effective ruler.
