= Martín Alonso Fernández de Córdoba Montemayor y Velasco =

Spanish nobleman

Martín Alonso Fernández de Córdoba Montemayor y Velasco (died August 1558) was a Spanish nobleman, first Count of Alcaudete, Viceroy of Navarra, and governor of Oran.

== Family ==
Alcaudete was the son to Fernández de Córdoba y Montemayor, the lord of Alcaudete and of Montemayor, and to María de Velasco, daughter of Count Siruela. He married Leonor Pacheco, daughter of Diego Fernández de Córdoba y Arellano, 1st Marquis of Comares. Their sons were

- Alfonso (1512-1565), the successor to Alcaudete;
- Diego (died 1558), who became Bishop of Calhorra;
- Martín (1520-1604), who also became Viceroy of Navarra and Governor of Oran;
- Francisco, knight of the Order of Calatrava.

== Career ==
He was corregidor of Toledo in 1523, was Viceroy of Navarra between 1527 and 1534. In 1534, he was appointed Governor ("Captain General") of the Spanish North African base of Oran in 1534.

In 1535, he attacked the Ottoman-held city of Tlemcen, capital of the Kingdom of Tlemcen, with 600 men, in collaboration with the local Banu Amir tribe of Abdul Rahman ibn Radwan. The project was to replace Sultan Muhammad of Tlemcen by his younger brother Abdulla. They were opposed by the Banu Rashid tribes under Sultan Muhammad, and the Spanish forces were besieged at the Tibda fortress and exterminated, except for 70 prisoners.

Around 1538–1540, as Emperor Charles V was attempting to persuade Ottoman admiral Hayreddin Barbarossa to defect, Count Alcaudete was attempting to do the same to Hasan Agha, deputy of Barbarossa and effective ruler of Algiers. The failure of both negotiations were part of the lead-up to the 1541 Algiers expedition, in which Charles V personally led the massive naval and land attack, joined by Alcaudete and the Oran garrison. The Spanish planned that the harsh autumn weather would delay a relief force from the Ottoman fleet while their own ships were safe in harbor, but the storms proved too severe, and the city's resistance too strong, such that Charles V was forced to withdraw after 3 days with devastating losses and himself nearly being captured.

Between January and March of 1543, he led an expedition to Tlemcen, deposing the Zayyanid ruler, Abu Zayyan III, and placing a vassal king, Abu Abdallah Muhammad VI.

Alcaudete also led several Spanish expeditions against Mostaganem, which took place in 1543 and 1547. They failed as the Spanish forces were repulsed and then pursued in retreat by Turkish and tribal forces.

Count Alcaudete joined the disastrous Expedition of Mostaganem in what was to be the final Spanish attempt to take the city. He had earlier requested the support of Juana, Princess of Portugal, in Valladolid. With his son Martín he led troops from Málaga and Cartagena to join the other Spanish men at Oran and their Moroccan allies in 1558, leaving his eldest son Alfonso to govern. In the ensuing battle Alcaudete's forces were eventually overwhelmed, and Alcaudete was trampled to death by his own soldiers. Martín was wounded and captured in the battle. As a prisoner in Algiers (now under Hasan Pasha) he tried to organize a revolt of Christian slaves in 1559, but was betrayed and many were executed. Martín was released in 1561 upon payment of the large ransom of 23,000 escudos by his brother Alfonso.
