= Diego Fernández de Córdoba, 3rd marquis of Comares =

Diego Fernández de Córdoba y Zúñiga (Oran, North Africa, 1524 - Arbeca, Catalonia, 27 September 1601), 3rd Marquis of Comares, called the African (el Africano), was a Castilian noble, soldier, and Governor of Oran and Mazalquivir.

== Biography ==
He was the son of Luis Fernández de Córdoba y Pacheco, 2nd Marquis of Comares (1482-1564), and grandson of Diego Fernández de Córdoba y Arellano, 1st Marquis of Comares (1464-1518), both Governors of Oran and Mazalquivir in North Africa.

He was known as "the African" because he spent much of his life on the coasts of North Africa. He succeeded his father, who died in 1564, as head of the family. Between 1569 and 1570, he fought against the rebellious Moriscos of Granada. He was then appointed Captain General of the Kingdom of Tunis and Governor of Oran and Mazalquivir in March 1573, a post he held for nine months, dedicating himself to capturing Algerian ships at sea and leading raids against the Moors.

Afterward, he remained at home for several years, occupied with the administration of the ducal estates of Segorbe and Cardona, which had passed to his wife in 1575. During this time, he attended all the major court ceremonies and, having been named a Knight of the Order of the Golden Fleece in 1585, received the Collar from the king. In 1586, he led two hundred men in repelling Drake's attack on Cádiz.

Between 1589 and 1594, he served for the second time as Captain General of the Kingdom of Tunis and Governor of Oran, and once again dedicated himself to clearing the seas of Algerian corsairs, capturing fourteen ships, and leading raids against the Moors.

His remains lie, along with those of his wife and several of his children, in the Poblet Monastery, which he greatly supported.

=== Marriage and children ===
He married around 1556 Duchess Joanna of Aragon and Cardona (ca), a noblewoman who held numerous titles and estates. She was the eldest daughter of Alfonso de Aragón y Portugal (1489–1563), and succeeded in 1572 her only brother Francisco who died without issue. She was IV Duchess of Segorbe, V Duchess of Cardona, XXXV Countess of Empúries, X Countess of Prades and Viscountess of Pallars.
The marriage produced 11 children of which 3 married :

- Juana (1557-1615), married Antonio Fernández de Córdoba y Cardona, V Duke of Sessa, had issue.
- Ana (1563-1622), married Beltrán de la Cueva y Castilla, VI Duke of Alburquerque, no issue.
- Luis Ramón (1568-1596), married Ana Enríquez de Cabrera y Mendoza, had issue.

Luis Ramón died before his parents, and therefore all their titles went to his son Enrique de Aragón Folc de Cardona y Córdoba (1588-1640).

== Sources ==
- López de Cárdenas, Fernando Josef (1777). Memorias de la ciudad de Lucena y su territorio (in Spanish). Écija: Imprenta de Benito Daza. p. 241-242.
- Ruano, Francisco; Ribadas, Juan (1779). Casa de Cabrera en Córdoba (in Spanish). Còrdova: Oficina de D. Juan Rodríguez. p. 81-82.
- Soler Salcedo, Juan Miguel (2009). Nobleza española: grandeza inmemorial (in Spanish). Madrid: Visión Libros. p. 176. ISBN 978-84-9983-402-3.
- Vincencio de Vidania, Diego (1696). Al rey nuestro señor... (in Spanish). Naples: Dominico Antonio Parrino i Miguel Luis Mucio. p. 25.
