= Spanish expedition to Tlemcen =

Spanish expedition to Tlemcen may refer to:

- Spanish expedition to Tlemcen (1535)
- Spanish expedition to Tlemcen (1543)
