= Francisco de Zúñiga Avellaneda y Velasco =

Spanish noble and politician

Francisco de Zúñiga Avellaneda y Velasco (around 1475 - Valladolid, 5 October 1536), member of the House of Zúñiga, III Count of Miranda del Castañar, XII Lord of Avellaneda and other towns, was a Spanish noble and politician. He was Viceroy of Navarre (1522-1527), member of the Council of State of the Catholic Monarchs and of Charles I of Spain, Mayordomo mayor of the Empress Isabella of Portugal, Grandee of Spain and a Knight of the Order of the Golden Fleece.

== Biography ==
Francisco was the firstborn of Pedro de Zúñiga y Avellaneda, II Count of Miranda del Castañar, XI Lord of Avellaneda, Íscar y de Peñaranda del Duero, etc., and his wife Catalina de Velasco y Mendoza, daughter of Pedro Fernández de Velasco, 2nd Count of Haro.

Francisco, became 3rd Count of Miranda del Castañar after his father's death on 5 October 1492.
He first served Joanna of Castile and her Flemish husband Philip the Handsome. When Philip the Handsome died in 1506 and Ferdinand the Catholic became Regent for his "mentally unstable" daughter Joanna of Castile, Francisco de Zúñiga was also sidelined.

When Ferdinand the Catholic died in 1516, Francisco de Zúñiga swore allegiance to his grandson and successor Charles I of Spain. He fought for Charles I against the Revolt of the Comuneros. He was appointed Captain General and Viceroy of Navarre by Emperor Charles on 1 November 1521, while Navarre was still being fought over with the French and Navarrese. He served as Viceroy of Navarre from 1522 to 1527.
He was appointed as a member of the Council of State during the absence of the Emperor in 1528. Francisco was also named second Mayordomo to the Emperor in 1528 and Mayordomo to the Empress Isabel in 1529.

Francisco was elected Knight of the Order of the Golden Fleece by Emperor Charles, and also Master and Sovereign Head of the Order at the chapter held in the Cathedral of Tournai, Flanders, from 3 to 5 December 1531.

Francisco de Zúñiga Avellaneda y Mendoza died on 5 October 1536 and was buried in the Monastery of Santa María de La Vid.

=== Marriage and children ===
He married María Enríquez de Cárdenas, daughter of Gutierre de Cárdenas Chacón, Grand Commander in León of the Order of Santiago, and his wife Teresa Enríquez, first cousin of King Ferdinand the Catholic. The marriage contract was granted in Tarazona on 24 September 1495.

They had following children:

- Francisco, IV Count of Miranda del Castañar, was his heir
- Gutierre, married to Jerónima Girón de Figueroa
- Gaspar de Zúñiga y Avellaneda, archbishop of Seville, archbishop of Santiago, Primate of Spain
- Ana, lady in the Court of the Empress Isabel, first abbess of the Monastery of the Franciscan Conceptionists of Peñaranda de Duero
- Teresa, married to Pedro de Zúñiga y Orantes, her cousin, I Marquis of Aguilafuente
- Catalina, married to Luis de Sandoval y Enríquez, III Marquis of Denia, II Count of Lerma.

Government offices
Preceded by 2nd Duke of Nájera	Viceroy of Navarre; 1522–1527	Succeeded by Count of Alcaudete
