= Alonso de Córdoba, Count of Alcaudete =

Spanish nobleman and administrator

- Born: September 6, 1512; Tafalla
- Died: February 27, 1565 (aged 52); Tudela
- Spouse: Francisca de Mendoza y Carvajal
- Children: 8
- Parents: Martin, Count of Alcaudete (father); Leonor Pacheco (mother)

Alfonso de Córdoba y Velasco (Tafalla (Navarra), 6 September 1512 – Tudela, 27 February 1565) was a Spanish nobleman, second Count of Alcaudete, Viceroy of Navarra, and governor of Oran.

== Biography ==
Alfonso was the eldest son of Martín Alonso Fernández de Córdoba Montemayor y Velasco, conde de Alcaudete and Leonor Pacheco, daughter of Diego Fernández de Córdoba y Arellano, 1st Marquis of Comares.

When his father became Governor of Oran in North Africa, he accompanied him and occasionally took over command during his father's absences when travelling to Spain. When his father was killed in the disastrous Expedition of Mostaganem (1558), Alfonso became the new governor and captain general of Oran and Mazalquivir. In 1561, Alfonso was able to finally free his younger brother Martin who had been taken prisoner by the Algerians at Mostaganem, after paying a ransom of 23,000 escudos. He reinforced the fortification and defense of the cities of Oran and Mazalquivir, which were attacked and besieged by a huge Algerian army in April 1563.
In command of Oran and with his brother Martin in command of Mazalquivir, they held the cities, inflicting heavy casualties on the besiegers.

After this successful battle, Alfonso was appointed Viceroy of Navarre by King Philip II on 5 September 1564. At the end of November, Alcaudete arrived in Navarra, but died of tuberculosis a little later, without even having reached his court at Pamplona.

=== Marriage and children ===
He married Francisca de Mendoza y Carvajal, daughter of Antonio de Mendoza, Viceroy of New Spain, and had 8 children, including :

- Alfonso, III conde de Alcaudete (1552-1590), no issue.
- Francisco, IV conde de Alcaudete (1553-1632), governor of Oran (1596-1604), had issue.

== Sources ==
- Real Academia de la Historia
- Geneaordonez
- Castilla.maxerco.es
