= Siege of Badajoz (1658) =

1658 battle during the Portuguese Restoration War

- Part of the Portuguese Restoration War
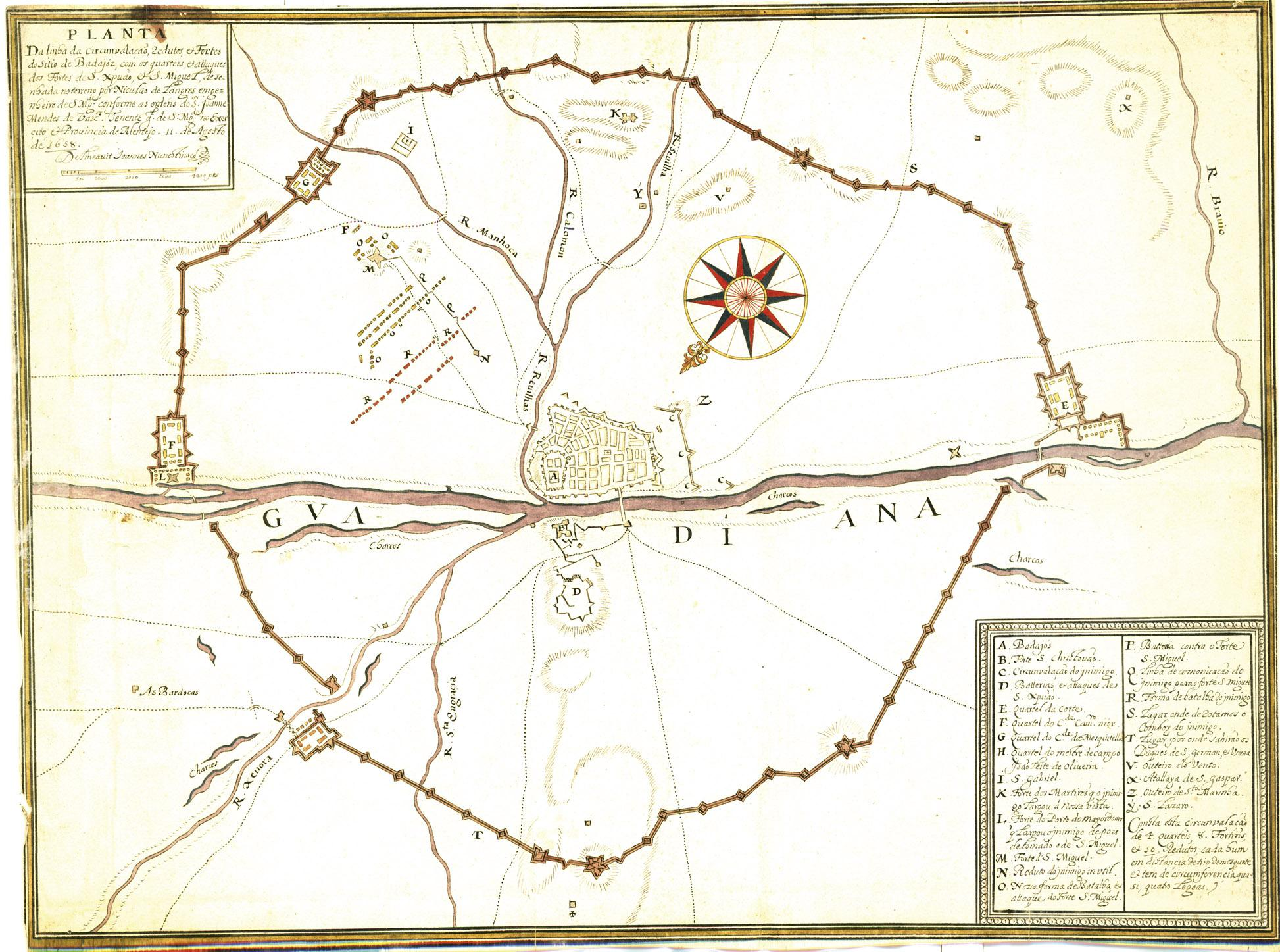
- Map of the Siege of Badajoz by João Nunes Tinoco
Date	July – October 1658
Location	Badajoz, Spain
Result	Spanish victory

Belligerents
Portugal	Spain

Commanders and leaders
(Portugal) Joanne Mendes de Vasconcelos	(Spain) Francisco de Tuttavilla (Spain) Rodrigo de Múgica (Spain) Luis de Haro

Strength
14,000 infantry, 3,000 cavalry, 20 cannons, 2 mortars	4,000 infantry, 2,000 cavalry (garrison); 12,000 infantry, 4,000 cavalry (relief army)

Casualties and losses
6,200: dead (by the plague and combat) or deserters	Unknown

The fourth siege of Badajoz took place from July to October 1658 during the Portuguese Restoration War. It was an attempt by a huge Portuguese army under the command of Joanne Mendes de Vasconcelos, governor of Alentejo, to capture the Spanish city of Badajoz, which was the headquarters of the Spanish Army of Extremadura. The fortifications of Badajoz were essentially medieval and considered vulnerable by the Portuguese, and had already been attacked by them three times during this war.

So in 1658, Mendes de Vasconcelos gathered an army at Elvas and advanced on Badajoz. The city was poorly defended and the Spanish troops under the command of Francisco de Tuttavilla, Duke of San Germán, looked principally to their own survival until a Spanish relief expedition could be mounted. The Portuguese forces launched a direct assault on the town, hoping initially to capture a key fort, San Cristóbal, but after 22 days of unsuccessful attack, the Portuguese abandoned this plan and began to build a circumvallation wall around Badajoz instead, to try to isolate the city. These plans received a boost when they captured a large Spanish defensive installation outside Badajoz, the Fort of San Miguel, but were unable to use this platform successfully against Badajoz itself.

The siege lasted for four months, during which time one-third of the Portuguese troops either died (mainly from the plague) or deserted. The arrival of a relief army, under King Philip IV of Spain's favorite don Luis de Haro in October, lifted the siege. Mendes de Vasconcelos, the Portuguese commander, was stripped of his rank and imprisoned for his failure.

Taking advantage of this failure, D. Luis de Haro, invaded Portugal and besieged Elvas, the main defensive system of Portugal - where the Portuguese army that had besieged Badajoz took refuge and was suffering a second catastrophic plague. A small relief army was improvised by the Portuguese which inflicted a crushing defeat on the Spanish army at the decisive battle of the Lines of Elvas (14 January 1659). This way, the Portuguese independence was granted while the Spanish reached military advantage in the secondary front of war, Minho and Galicia.

== Background ==
After the death of John IV of Portugal in 1656, various Spanish offensives were launched against Portuguese territory, mainly from Extremadura, but also from Galicia, where a second front was opened to force the Portuguese to divide their forces. The Spanish Army of Extremadura, recently reinforced with many veterans of the war against France, was commanded by Francisco de Tuttavilla, Duke of San German, who appointed Gaspar Téllez-Girón y Sandoval, Duke of Osuna, as general of artillery and his second-in-command. In 1657 they laid siege to the Portuguese town of Olivença with 8,000 soldiers and 29 cannons and occupied the town, despite a desperate attempt by the Count of San Lorenzo, military governor of Alentejo, to dislodge them by launching a surprise attack himself on the Spanish town of Badajoz. Mourão fell into Spanish hands shortly thereafter. San Lorenzo was then dismissed from his command and replaced by dom Joanne Mendes de Vasconcelos, who easily managed to retake both Mourão and Olivença in the following months, since their Spanish garrisons had been considerably diminished in order to move troops to face the French armies in Catalonia.

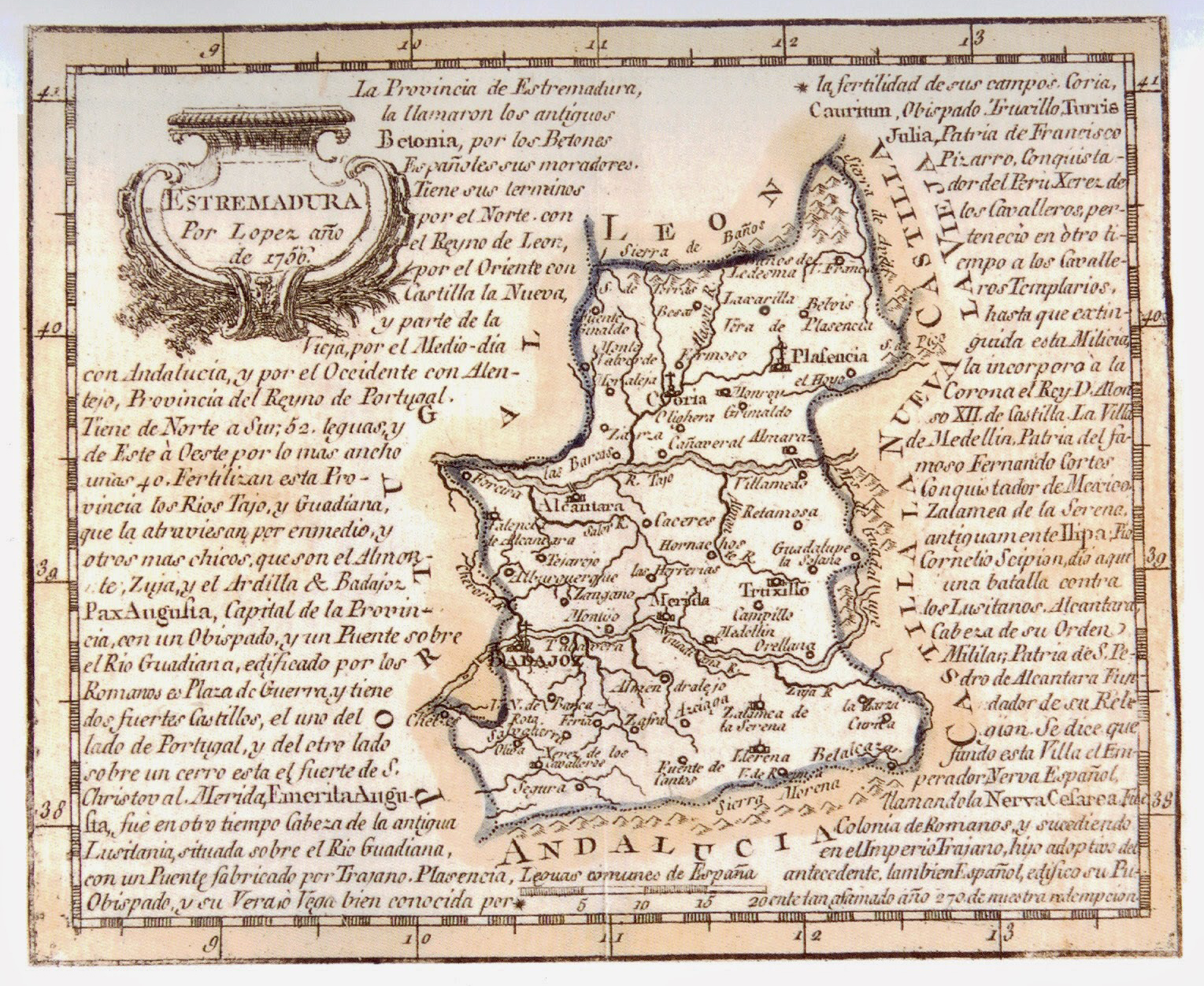
Map of Extremadura by Thomas Lopez

Mendes de Vasconcelos, encouraged by his successes, promised the Portuguese Queen Regent Luisa de Guzmán that he would capture the town of Badajoz, headquarters of the Spanish Army of Extremadura and therefore the most important Spanish fortress near the Portuguese frontier. The Count of Sabugal suggested that an offensive in the north, to conquer the Galician city of Tui, would be easier, due to the mild climate of the coast, and suggested that this would also be strategically more beneficial as it would secure the province of Entre Douro e Minho. But the queen and her ministers preferred Mendes de Vasconcelos' plan. He was given command of an army consisting of 14,000 infantry and 3,000 cavalry troops with a train of 20 cannons and 2 mortars, gathered in the main fortress of Elvas. Mendes de Vasconcelos' second-in-command was the recently appointed Maestro de Campo General dom Rodrigo de Castro, a friend of the Count of Soure, Vasconcelos' enemy in the court, which was a cause of friction between them.

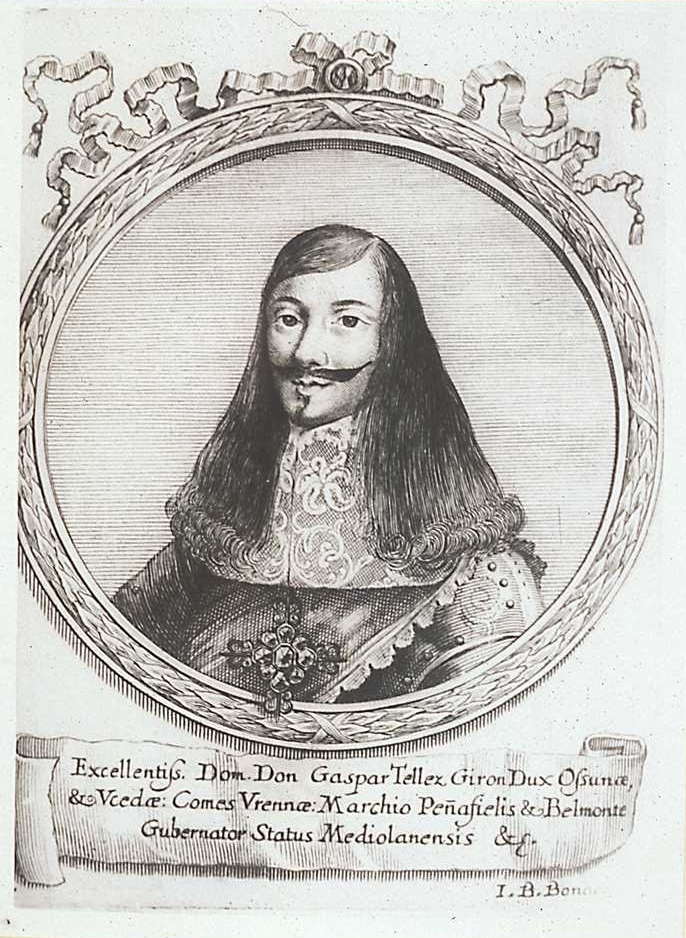
Engraving of Gaspar Téllez-Girón, 5th Duke de Osuna by Giovanni Battista Bonacina

The Spanish fortress town of Badajoz was at that time garrisoned by 4,000 infantry and 2,000 cavalry soldiers. The military governor of the fortress was the Marquis of Lanzarote, Diego Paniagua y Zúñiga, but the command of the army belonged to the Duke of San German, who had retreated to Badajoz after the loss of Olivenza, which he had briefly attempted to retake. The infantry was led by don Diego Caballero de Illescas, the tercios by don Rodrigo de Múgica y Butrón, the cavalry by the Duke of Osuna, and the artillery by don Gaspar de la Cueva, brother of the Viceroy of New Spain. The defenses of the town consisted essentially of an old Moorish Alcazaba and a medieval wall dating from the Almohad period, reinforced since the outbreak of the war in 1640 by various newly built bulwarks and ravelins.

== Siege ==
=== Preliminary maneuvers ===
The Portuguese army left its fortress at Elvas on 12 July and arrived outside Badajoz the following day. A company of cuirassiers under dom Luiz de Menezes and some cavalry troops commanded by dom André de Albuquerque were confronted near a bridge over the Guadiana river by a Spanish cavalry party led by the Duke of Osuna. Both units retreated after inflicting serious losses upon each other in a bloody fight, the Spanish seeking protection behind the walls of the town. Mendes de Vasconcelos arrived shortly thereafter with the main Portuguese army, with its artillery, and a large number of supply wagons brought from Elvas. Seeing the strength of the Portuguese army, the Duke of San German hastily sent a message calling on Philip IV for help.

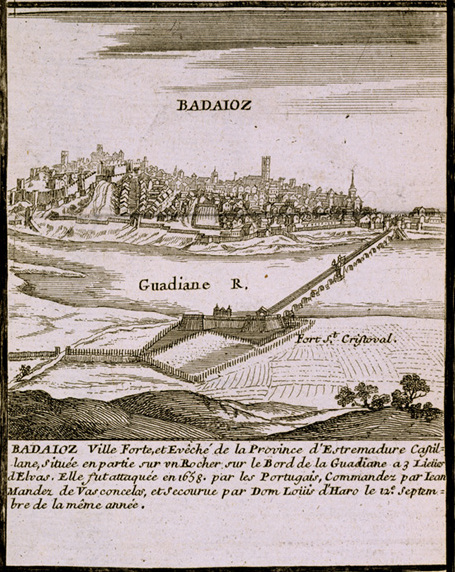
View of Fort San Cristóbal in an engraving by G. Baillieu from the Atlas françois: contenant les cartes geographiques dans lesquelles sont tres exactement remarquez

Despite the longstanding danger of a Portuguese attack, the situation of the Spanish force in Badajoz was dreadful. The garrison suffered from a lack of ammunition and supplies, the soldiers were dressed in rags or were practically nude, and there was none among the civilian population of the town trained to wield a weapon. The Duke of San German put soldiers and civilians to work on the fortifications and storing food. The Portuguese sappers, meanwhile, proceeded to prepare the field for an assault upon the fortress. Mendes de Vasconcelos had decided, in a war council with many other senior officers, to attack Fort San Cristóbal, a key point in the Badajoz defenses. This fort, built after 1640, covered a bridgehead over the Guadiana river, thus guarding access to the city. A redoubt was quickly strengthened on the bridgehead by the Spanish sappers, who, protected by the Duke of Osuna and his cavalry, also widened the trenches which connected it with Fort San Cristóbal, the garrison of which was being strengthened every day along a strongly defended communication road.

The Portuguese assault was thoroughly prepared. The plan was for six Portuguese squadrons under dom João da Silva to block the entrance to the bridge, isolating the redoubt from Fort San Crisóbal. The fort would in turn be attacked by Alfonso Futrado and Simon Correa da Silva. Maestre de Campo dom Diogo Gomes was given the task of cutting the communication lines along the Guadiana river and Pedro Almado of distracting several minor forts nearby. Some cavalry regiments were deployed in the expectation of a fierce Spanish resistance.

The assault, however, was a costly failure. After twenty-two days of prolonged action, during which the defenders, led by the Marquis of Lanzarote, virtually wiped out Almado's regiment with musketry fire and firebombs, Mendes de Vasconcelos ordered a withdrawal.

=== Attempted encirclement ===
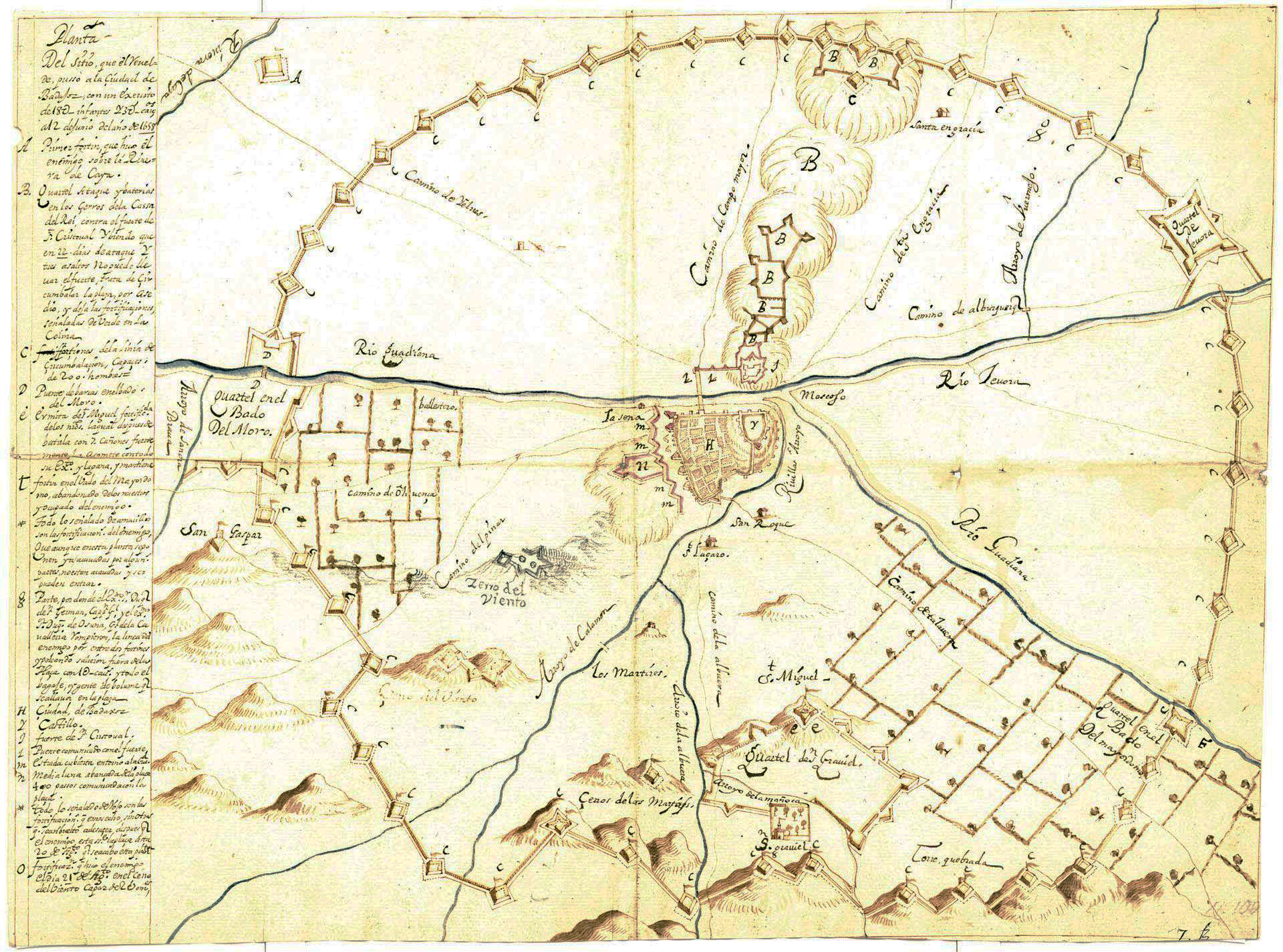
The Spanish fortifications and Portuguese lines of circumvallation according to a Spanish contemporaneous map

The Portuguese general, convinced of the impossibility of taking Badajoz by assault, changed his strategy and began a circumvallation of the town, in order to try to isolate it completely. The Spanish, meanwhile, were reinforcing their own defensive fortifications with extensive works, mainly ravelins built between the medieval towers. Various outlying forts were also strengthened with the aim of obstructing the Portuguese works and forcing them to build a larger circumvallation line. One of these forts was San Miguel, a star fort able to accommodate 600 infantry, built around a hermitage. It had five earthen bulwarks and an artillery-proof parapet.

Portuguese sappers built a pontoon bridge over the Guadiana river which united two Portuguese quarters in Vado del Moro and allowed Mendes de Vasconcelos' troops to cross the river. Having reinforced Santa Engracia, north of San Critsóbal, and fortified a bridge over the Gévora river, they built, unmolested, an arc of the circumvallation from Gévora to Vado del Moro. Fort del Mayordomo, located near the Guadiana river, had been abandoned by its Spanish garrison shortly after being built. The Portuguese used it to cover the construction of the circumvallation line to the Guadiana. They also tried to occupy Cerro del Viento, a hill near Vado del Moro, but were repelled by the Spanish garrison that was there and had to build the circumvallation line behind it. Given the strategic importance of Cerro del Viento, the nearby hill of Cerro de las Mayas had been earmarked for an improvised star fortification by the Italian general Ventura de Tarragona, but it had not been built, leaving the Fort of San Miguel vulnerable.

Rodrigo de Múgica y Butrón in a painting from the old gallery of Marquis de Leganés

Mendes de Vasconcelos instructed dom André de Albuquerque, dom Rodrigo de Castro and the Count of Misquitella to occupy the Convent of San Gabriel. All the Portuguese cavalry and five terços were dispatched with this aim. They passed through the undefended Cerro de las Mayas and easily overran the convent, whose small Spanish garrison promptly surrendered. The Portuguese sappers then began to build a fort in front of an old watchtower known as "Torre quebrada", located between the convent and the Fort of San Miguel. The continued Spanish occupation of the Fort of San Miguel was preventing the completion of the circumvallation line, so its capture was a priority to Vasconcellos. Albuquerque and the Count of Misquitellos, assisted by the engineers Nicolao de Lanres, Pedro de S. Coloma, and Luiz Serrão Pimentel, planned an assault on the fortification.

On 20 June, after an ineffective bombardment by a 6-gun battery put in place to try to breach the parapets, the Portuguese tercios and the cavalry, the latter covered by ranks of musketeers, were ordered to attack. The advance was made difficult by the presence of vineyard fences in the field. Moreover, 5 Portuguese battalions at the head of the attack were surprised by the Spanish cavalry of the Duke of Osuna and his general, don Juan de Pacheco, followed by the Duke of San German who, with various Spanish tercios, had sallied out of Badajoz in order to try to counter the Portuguese assault. Maestre de Campo of Tercio de la Armada, whose brother the Irish officer William Dongan was the commander of the Fort of San Miguel, managed to reach the fort. Albuquerque, meanwhile ordered dom Luiz de Menezes to reinforce his vanguard battalions. The Portuguese cavalry was also sent into action. Teniente General Diniz de Mello de Castro was wounded and captured, but a Spanish counter-attack was repelled and the Fort of San Miguel finally surrendered.

=== Skirmishing and bombardment ===
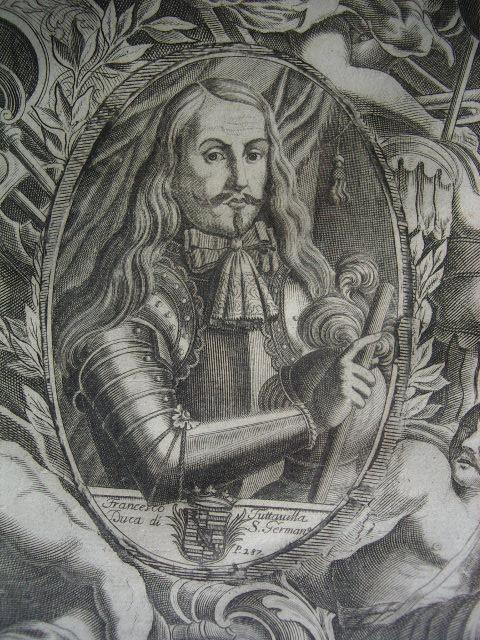
Francisco Tuttavilla, Duke of San Germán – unknown author

The capture of Fort San Miguel allowed the Portuguese sappers to complete the circumvallation works, which consisted of a continuous line of little forts, each able to garrison as many as about 200 soldiers, or perhaps as few as 25 musketeers. The Spanish also continued strengthening their defenses. The Southwestern section of the wall was fortified at Pedraleras, and a ravelin was erected 400 meters in front of the Gate of Santa Maria. No significant action took place during this period, except for an ambush near San Gabriel by André de Albuquerque, against a Spanish supply convoy sent from La Albuera, and various sorties by the garrison of Badajoz to try to obstruct the Portuguese works. A night attack by the Spanish Duke of Osuna against a Portuguese section cost Mendes de Vasconcelos 200 infantry and 40 horses.

On 6 August, however, Osuna and San German abandoned the town, and with 1,200 cavalry soldiers, broke the lines of circumvallation near the quarter of Santa Engracia, between two Portuguese redoubts, reaching Alburquerque shortly thereafter. San German was replaced in the command of Badajoz by Rodrigo de Múgica y Butrón, his Maestre de Campo General. The Spanish concentrated their efforts on the defense of a large ravelin in Pradaleras garrisoned by 2,000 infantry and 1,000 cavalry, against Portuguese artillery fire from Cerro del Viento and San Miguel. In late August, news of the formation of a relief army under Philip IV of Spain's favorite Luis de Haro reached the Portuguese camp, increasing the pressure upon Mendes de Vasconcelos to bring his siege to a conclusion. Unfortunately, the damage caused by the bombardment of the Spanish positions was minor, and heat and disease was decimating the Portuguese army.

=== Relief ===
The Duke of Medina de las Torres had suggested that Philip IV himself should lead the relief of Badajoz in the company of all the Grandees of Spain. Luis de Haro, Philip IV's favourite, however, feared that Queen Mariana of Austria would be given the government of the country during the absence of the king, and, although having no military experience, offered himself to lead the relief army. His force consisted of up to 12,000 infantry and 4,500 cavalry, or perhaps as little as 8,000 infantry and 1,000 cavalry. Haro did not reach Badajoz until mid-October, but his appearance compelled Mendes de Vasconcelos to abandon the siege. The buildings in Cerro del Viento were set on fire and the bridge over the Gévora river was destroyed, The Portuguese army retreated unmolested to Elvas having lost 6,200 men in all, either killed in battle or dead from disease.

== Aftermath ==
Don Luis de Haro, anonymous painting from the Uffizi Gallery

When the Spanish relief army arrived, Luis de Haro entered Badajoz, where he was acclaimed by some as "Liberator of the town and Restorator of the Monarchy". In Portugal, Queen Luisa de Guzmán imprisoned Mendes de Vasconcelos for his failure to capture Badajoz. News of a further setback for the Portuguese arrived from the northern frontier, as a Spanish army commanded by the Governor of Galicia, Rodrigo Pimentel, Marquis of Viana, entered Portuguese territory in early September, defeating a Portuguese army led by João Rodrigues de Vasconcelos e Sousa, 2nd Count of Castelo Melhor at the Battle of Vilanova. Spanish forces proceeded over the following months to capture Lapela, Monção, Salvatierra de Miño and other Portuguese strongholds. De Haro, meanwhile, decided to attack Portugal on his own and, against the advice of the Duke of San German, advanced towards the Portuguese fortress of Elvas.

Elvas was reached by the Spanish army on 22 October and a siege begun. Although the fortifications could not ensure safety from a full-scale assault supported with heavy guns, they enabled the defenders to withstand a considerable attack for enough time to allow the Portuguese to mobilize a relief army in Estremoz, firstly under André de Albuquerque and later under António Luís de Meneses, Count of Cantanhede. On 17 January, around 8 o'clock in the morning, the Portuguese attacked the Spanish in their trenches. The battle was undecided in its initial stages, as the Duke of San Germán and other Spanish generals made every effort to collect their troops and recover the lost ground, but after some time, the Portuguese forces of Cantanhede managed to break the lines and the Spanish retreated to Badajoz with great loss: from the initial army of 17, 500 men, only 5,000 infantry men plus 1,300 horsemen managed to reach Badajoz, and all the artillery together with 5,000 men, 15,000 firearms, luggage and correspondence, were captured. The Portuguese army again besieged Badajoz shortly after, bringing events in the region full circle, but failed once again to take the city. By then, the signing of the Treaty of the Pyrenees had ended Spains's war with France and the recovery of Portugal had become the main objective of Philip IV.
