= Antonio Pedro Sancho Dávila y Osorio =

Spanish noble, military, politician and diplomat

Captain General Antonio Sancho Dávila y Toledo Colonna 10th Marquess of Astorga 4th Marquess of Velada 3rd Marquess of San Román 9th Count of Trastámara 11th Count of Santa Marta Lord of Villalobos
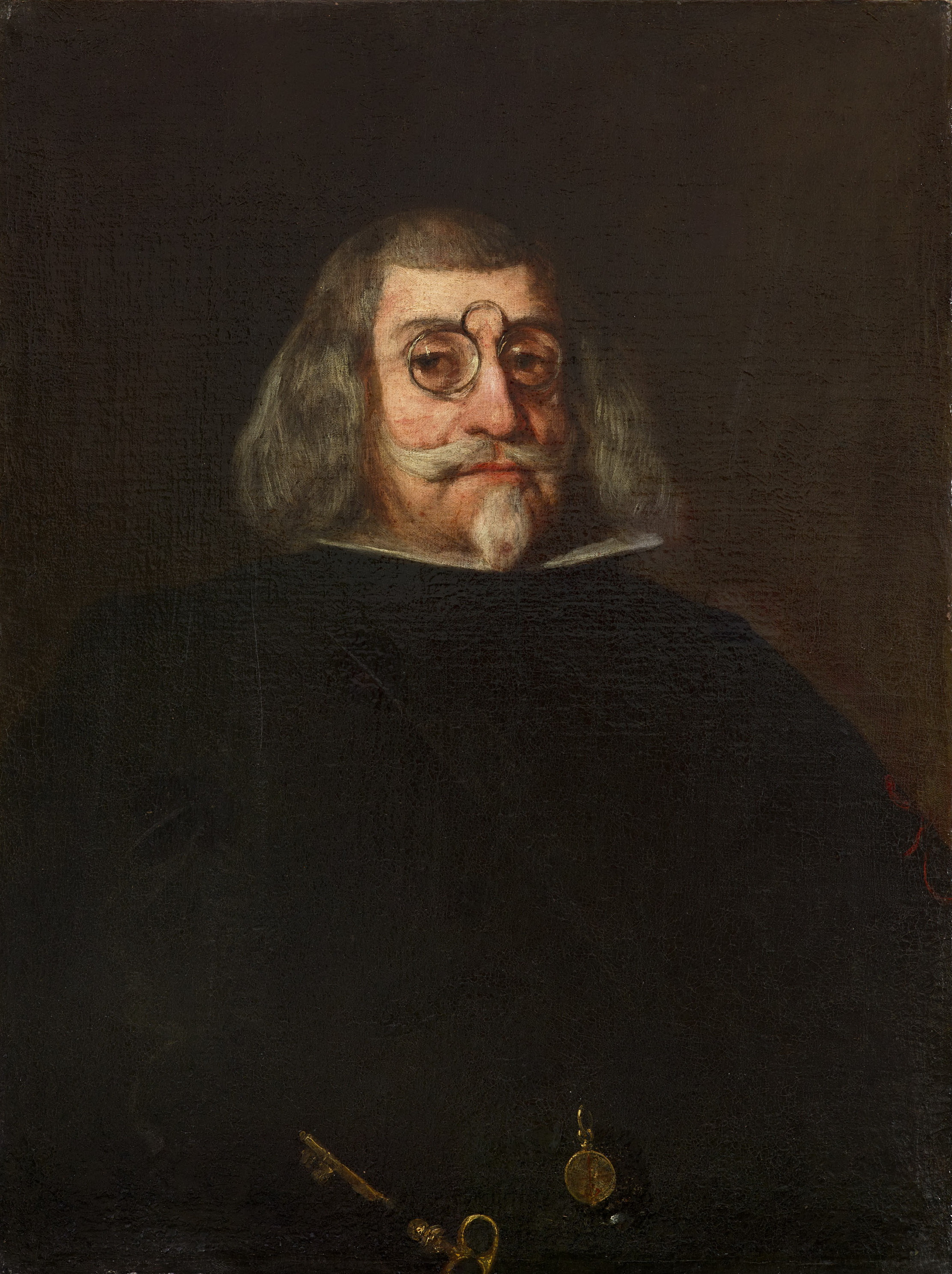
- The Marquess of Astorga between 1657 and 1660 by Alonso Cano.
- Born: Antonio Pedro Sancho Álvarez Osorio y Gómez Dávila; 1615; Madrid, Crown of Castile, Spanish Empire
- Died: 27 February 1689 (aged 73–74); Madrid, Crown of Castile, Spanish Empire
- Spouse(s): Juana María de Velasco y Osorio; Ana María de Guzmán y Silva (1634–1637); María Pimentel
- Relatives: Antonio Sancho Davila (father); Constanza Osorio (mother); Bernardino Sancho Dávila y Osorio (brother); Fernando Sancho Dávila y Osorio (brother); Ana Sancho Dávila y Osorio (sister)
- Military career
- Allegiance: Spanish Empire
- Branch: (Spain) Spanish Army
- Service years: 1642–1660
- Rank: Captain General
- Conflicts: Franco-Spanish War: Reapers' War

Governor of Oran
- In office 1652–1660
- Monarch: Philp IV
- Preceded by: Antonio de Zúñiga y de la Cueva
- Succeeded by: Gaspar Felipe de Guzmán

Viceroy of Navarre
- In office 8 May 1662 – 21 April 1664
- Monarch: Philp IV
- Preceded by: Antonio Álvarez de Toledo y Enríquez de Ribera
- Succeeded by: Francisco de Tutavilla y del Rufo

Viceroy of Valencia
- In office 1664–1666
- Monarchs: Philp IV; Charles II
- Regent: Mariana of Austria
- Preceded by: Basilio de Castelví y Ponce
- Succeeded by: Gaspar Felipe de Guzmán y Mejía

Ambassadors of Spain to the Holy See
- In office 1667–1672
- Monarch: Charles II
- Regent: Mariana of Austria
- Chief Minister: Juan Everardo Nithard; Fernando de Valenzuela
- Preceded by: Pedro Antonio de Aragón
- Succeeded by: Gaspar Méndez de Haro

Viceroy of Naples
- In office 1672–1675
- Monarch: Charles II
- Regent: Mariana of Austria
- Preceded by: Fadrique Alvarez de Toledo y Ponce de León
- Succeeded by: Fernando Joaquín Fajardo de Requeséns y Zúñiga

Antonio Pedro Sancho Dávila y Osorio (or Álvarez Osorio y Gómez Dávila), X Marquess of Astorga, (c. 1615 - Madrid, 27 February 1689) was a Spanish noble, soldier, politician and diplomat.

== Early life ==
He was the eldest son of Antonio Sancho Davila, Marquis of Velada, Governor of the Duchy of Milan, and Constanza Osorio (a daughter of Pedro Álvarez Osorio, 9th Marquess of Astorga). Besides Marquess of Astorga, he was also 4th Marquess of Velada, and 3rd Marquess of la Villa de San Román, 9th Count of Trastámara and 9th Count of Santa Marta, Lord of the House of Villalobos and twice Grandee of Spain.

== Career ==
Throughout his life he was a gentleman of the chamber of Felipe IV and Carlos II, captain of the Spanish army during the Catalan Revolt, and Governor of the North African cities of Oran and Mazalquivir (1652-1660). In 1662, he was appointed Viceroy of Navarre and in 1664 Viceroy of Valencia.

In 1667, he became Ambassador of Spain to the Holy See, where he influenced the conclaves which chose Popes Clement IX (1667) and Clement X (1670). For this he was awarded with the Viceroyalty of Naples (1672-1675). After his return, he became Councilor of State and Majordomo of Queen Marie Louise d'Orléans.

Astorga carried out his responsibility as Majordomo of the Queen until her death, which occurred on 12 February 1689. Astorga survived his Queen for barely two weeks, as he died in Madrid on the 27th of the same month.

== Personal life ==
Dávila married three times. His first marriage was in 1634, with his niece, Juana María de Velasco y Osorio, Marchioness of Salinas de Río Pisuerga. She died in October 1634 from typhus.

His second marriage was to Ana María de Guzmán y Silva, Countess of Saltés. She died in 1637.

His third, and final, marriage was to María Pimentel, daughter of the Juan Francisco Pimentel, 7th Duke of Benavente.

He had no surviving children from his three marriages, so his noble titles passed to his sister Ana, the only survivor of his siblings at the time of his death.
