= Martín de Córdoba y Velasco, marqués de Cortes =

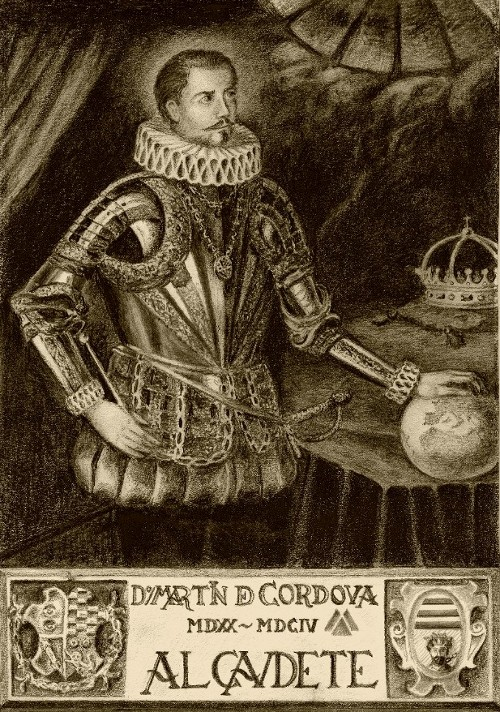
Martin de Córdoba Portrait

Martín de Córdoba y Velasco (died 1604), was Marquis of Cortes and governor of Oran.

== Biography ==
He was the third son of Martín Alonso Fernández de Córdoba Montemayor y Velasco, conde de Alcaudete and Maria Leonor Pacheco.

He participated in the disastrous Expedition of Mostaganem (1558), where his father was killed. Martín de Córdoba was captured and imprisoned as a Christian slave in Algiers under the beylerbey Hasan Pasha, until he was exchanged for the huge ransom of 23,000 escudos by his brother Alfonso de Córdoba y Velasco.

He distinguished himself in repulsing the Sieges of Oran and Mers El Kébir in 1563. Between 1575 and 1585, he was Spanish governor of Oran. He was also Viceroy of Navarre between 1589 and 1595.

He married Jerónima de Navarra y Enríquez de la Carra Marquesa de Cortes and died in 1604.

== Sources ==
Genealogy
