= Antonio Sancho Davila, Marquis of Velada =

Spanish noble, soldier, diplomat and statesman

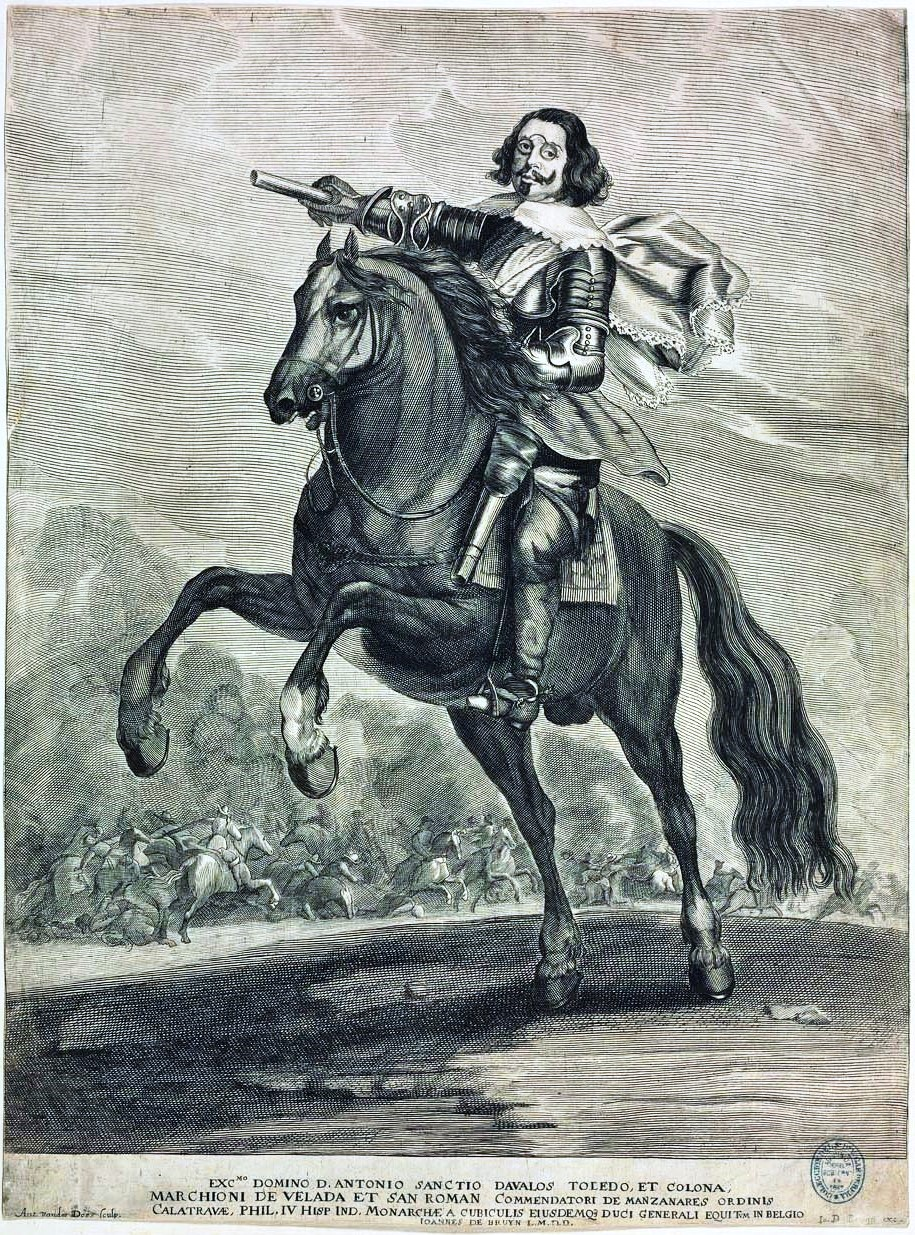
Portrait of Antonio Sancho Davila, Marquis of Velada

Antonio Sancho Dávila y Toledo Colonna (Madrid, 15 January 1590 - Madrid, 25 August 1666), 3rd Marquis of Velada and 1st Marquis of San Román, Grandee of Spain, was a Spanish noble, soldier, diplomat and statesman. He served in the military campaigns in North Africa and in the war in Flanders and was Governor of Milan.

== Biography ==
He was the only son of Gómez Dávila y Toledo, 2nd Marquis of Velada, and Ana de Toledo Colonna. In his childhood he served as a page to Queen Margaret of Austria and later as a gentleman of the chamber to King Philip III in 1610.

In 1614, on the occasion of his marriage to Constanza Osorio, Philip III granted him the marquisate of San Román. In 1616 he received the habit of Knight of the Order of Calatrava, of which he was commander of Manzanares.

=== Service in Africa ===
A political enemy of the King's Valido, the Duke of Uceda, he was sidelined during the first part of his adult life. In 1625 he was sent to North Africa as Governor of Oran, Mazalquivir and Tlemcen, where he remained until 1628. The following year he was given command of a fleet destined to recover the town of San Jorge de Elmina in Ghana, but this expedition was never carried out. Later, with the rank of captain general of sea and land, he was entrusted with the direction of an armada that would expel the Dutch from their settlements on the coast of Brazil, but this mission also never came to fruition.

=== In the war in Flanders ===
In 1636 he was assigned to the Spanish Netherlands, where the Eighty Years' War was still raging, in which the forces of the Dutch Republic led by stadtholder Frederick Henry, Prince of Orange faced the Spanish troops of the governor of the Netherlands, Ferdinand of Austria. With the position of Maestre de campo, Dávila participated in several battles and was able to build an excellent military reputation.

In 1640, together with the Bolognese Virgilio Malvezzi, he was sent as extraordinary ambassador to London in support of Alonso de Cárdenas, with the mission of concluding an alliance with Charles I of England. The Spanish intentions were to avoid an alliance of England with France (in conflict with Spain in the Franco-Spanish war) and with the United Provinces, and to prevent the wedding of William II, Prince of Orange with Mary Henrietta Stuart. The diplomatic mission would fail, and Dávila returned to the Spanish Netherlands in March 1641.

Back in the Spanish Netherlands, and after the death of the Cardinal Infante Ferdinand of Austria, he became second in command, behind the new governor Francisco de Melo. He took part in the Spanish victory in the Battle of Honnecourt (1642) as a cavalry general.

=== Governor of Milan ===
In 1643, he was appointed Governor of the Duchy of Milan, where the Marquis served until 1646. During this time he carried out a profound reform of the army and directed an ambitious project to fortify the Spanish defences. In 1645, he successfully repelled an attack by Thomas Francis, Prince of Carignano, near the Mora River. After his mandate he obtained permission to return to Spain, where Philip IV offered him the viceroyalty of Sicily and the Captaincy General of Catalonia, which he rejected, alleging poor health.

=== Return to Spain ===
In 1646 he left the government of Milan and returned to Spain, where the following year he held the position of State counselor to Philip IV. In December 1653 he took over the Presidency of the Council of the Military Orders on an interim basis during the absence of the incumbent Gaspar de Bracamonte Guzmán. In 1660 he was named governor of the Supreme Council of Italy and President of the Supreme Council of Flanders.

=== Marriage and children ===
From his marriage in 1614 with Constanza Osorio, daughter of Pedro Álvarez Osorio y Osorio, 8th Marquess of Astorga, he had four children:

- Antonio Pedro Sancho (1615-1689), who as the first-born succeeded him in his titles of nobility. No issue.
- Bernardino. No issue.
- Fernando. No issue.
- Ana (died 1692), 11th Marchioness of Astorga, married Manuel Luis de Guzmán y Zúñiga, 9th Marquess of Ayamonte. Had issue.

Government offices
Preceded by Juan de Velasco, Count of Siruela	Governor of the Duchy of Milan; 1643–1646	Succeeded by Bernardino Fernández de Velasco, 6th Duke of Frías
