= List of governors of Oran =

This is a list of the Arab, Spanish and Algerine governors or Beys of Oran.

Tenure	Incumbent	Notes
Caliphate Suzerainty
902–910	Muhammad bin Abi Aoun, Governor	Founder of the new city under the governorate of Al-Andalus (Umayyad Caliphate).
910	Dawas bin Solat, Governor	
910–954	Muhammad bin Abi Aoun, Governor	2nd Term
954–???	Ya'la ibn Abi Muhammad al-Yifrani, Governor	
???–???	..., Governor	
1015–????	Ya'la ibn Futuh al-Azdaji, Governor	
????–????	..., Governor	
????–1144	Lub ibn Maimun, Governor	
1144–????	..., Governor	
Spanish Suzerainty, administered as Spanish Oran
1509–1509	Pedro Navarro, conde de Oliveto, Governor	Took the city from the Zayyanids.
1509–1510	Rui Días Álvares de Rojas, Governor	
1510–1512	Diego Fernández de Córdoba, Governor	1st Term
1512–1516	Martín de Argote, Governor	
1516–1518	Diego Fernández de Córdoba y Arellano, marqués de Comares, Governor	2nd Term, died in office
1518–1520	Luis Fernández de Córdoba y Pacheco, 2nd Marquis of Comares, Governor	1st Term, son of his predecessor
1520–1523	Luis de Cárdenas, Governor	
1523–1531	Luis Fernández de Córdoba y Pacheco, 2nd Marquis of Comares, Governor	2nd Term
1531–1534	Pedro de Godoy, Governor	
1534–1558	Martín Alonso Fernández de Córdoba Montemayor y Velasco, conde de Alcaudete, Governor	
1558–1564	Alonso de Córdoba y Fernández de Velasco, conde de Alcaudete, Governor	
1564–1565	Andrés Ponce de León, Governor	
1565–1567	Hernán Tello de Guzmán, Governor	
1567–1571	Pedro Luis Galcerán de Borja y de Castro-Pinós, marqués de Navarrés, Governor	
1571–1573	Felipe Galcerán de Borja, Governor	
1573–1574	Diego Fernández de Córdoba, 3rd marquis of Comares, Governor	1st Term
1574–1575	Luis de Bocanegra, Governor	
1575–1585	Martín de Córdoba y Velasco, marqués de Cortes, Governor	
1585–1589	Pedro de Padilla, Governor	
1589–1594	Diego Fernández de Córdoba, 3rd marquis of Comares, Governor	2nd Term
1594–1596	Gabriel Niño de Zúñiga, Governor	
1596–1604	Francisco de Córdoba y Velasco, conde de Alcaudete, Governor	
1604–1607	Juan Ramírez de Guzmán, conde de Teba, Governor	
1607–1608	Diego de Toledo y Guzmán, Governor	
1608–1616	Felipe Ramírez de Arellano, conde de Aguilar de Inestrillas, Governor	
1616–1625	Jorge de Cárdenas Manrique, duque de Maqueda, Governor	
1625–1628	Antonio Sancho Davila y Toledo, marqués de Velada, Governor	
1628–1632	Francisco González de Andía y Irarrazábal y Zárate, visconde de Santa Clara de Avedillo, Governor	
1632–1639	Antonio de Zúñiga y de la Cueva, marqués de Flores Dávila, Governor	1st Term
1639–1643	Álvaro de Bazán Manrique de Lara y Benavides, marqués del Viso, Governor	
1643–1647	Rodrigo Pimentel Ponce de León, marqués de Viana, Governor	
1647–1652	Antonio de Zúñiga y de la Cueva, marqués de Flores Dávila, Governor	2nd Term
1652–1660	Antonio Gómez Dávila Toledo y Osorio, marqués de San Román, Governor	
1660–1666	Gaspar Felipe de Guzmán, duque de San Lucar, Governor	
1666–1672	Fernando Joaquín Fajardo de Requeséns y Zúñiga, marqués de los Vélez, Governor	
1672–1675	Diego de Portugal, Governor	
1675–1678	Iñigo de Toledo y Osorio, Governor	
1678–1681	Pedro Andrés Ramírez de Guzmán y Acuña, marqués de Algava, Governor	
1681–1682	Gaspar Portocarrero, conde de la Monclova, Governor	
1682–1683	Pedro Félix José de Silva y Meneses, conde de Cifuentes, Governor	
1683–1685	Juan de Villalpando, marqués de Osera, Governor	
1685–1687	Antonio Paniagua de Loaysa y Zúñiga, marqués de Santa Cruz de Paniangua, Governor	
1687–1687	Diego de Bracamonte, conde de Bracamonte, Governor	
1687–1691	Félix Nieto da Silva, conde de Guaro, Governor	
1691–1692	Jean-Louis d'Orléans, comte de Charny, Governor	
1692–1697	Andrés Copola, duque de Cansano, Governor	
1697–1701	Gonzalo Arias Dávila Pacheco oloma y Borja, marqués de Casasola, Governor	
1701–1704	Juan Francisco Manrique de Araña, Governor	
1704–1707	Carlo Carafa, Governor	
1707–1708	Melchor de Avellaneda Sandoval y Romero, Marquis of Valdecañas, Governor	
Algerine Suzerainty
1708	Annexed by the Beylik of Mascara, part of the Regency of Algiers	
1708–1732	Mustapha Bouchelaghem, Bey	Took the city from Spain
Spanish Suzerainty, administered as Spanish Oran
1732–1732	Álvaro de Navia Osorio y Vigil, marqués de Santa Cruz de Marcenado, Governor	Killed in a raid by Arab tribes
1733–1733	Antonio Arias del Castillo, marqués de Villadarias, Governor	
1733–1738	José Vallejo, Governor	
1738–1742	José Basilio de Aramburu, Governor	
1742–1748	Alexandre de la Mothe, Governor	
1748–1752	Pedro de Algaín, marqués de al Real Corona, Governor	
1752–1758	Juan Antonio de Escoiquiz, Governor	
1758–1765	Juan Martín Zermeño, Governor	1st Term
1765–1768	Cristóbal de Córdoba, Governor	
1767–1770	Victorio Alcondolo Bolognino Visconti, conde de Bolognino, Governor	
1770–1774	Eugenio Fernández de Álvarado y Perales Hurtado y Colomo, Governor	
1774–1778	Pedro Martín Zermeño, Governor	2nd Term
1778–1779	Luís de Carajal, Governor	
1779–1785	Pedro Guelif, Governor	
1785–1789	Luís de la Casas y Aragon, Governor	
1789–1790	Manuel Pineda de la Torre y Solís, marqués de Campo Santo, Governor	
1790–1791	Joaquín Mayone y Ferrari, conde de Cumbre Hermosa, Governor	
1791–1792	Juan de Courten, Governor	
Algerine suzerainty
1792	Re-incorporated into the Beylik of Mascara, became capital of the province	
1792–1798/1799	Mohammed el Kebir, Bey	Retook the city from Spain in 1792
1798/1799–1802	Osman Bey, Bey	Son of Mohammed el-Kebir
1802–1805	Mustafa Bey al-Manzalah, Bey	1st Term
1805?–1807	Mohammed Bey Makkalas, Bey	Son of Mohammed el-Kebir, executed.
1807–1807	Mustafa Bey al-Manzalah, Bey	2nd Term
1807–1812	Mohammed bou Kabous, Bey	Brother of Mohammed, executed
1812–1817	Ali Kora Bargli, Bey	Nicknamed the "Turk", executed
1827–1831	Hassan Bey, Bey	Last Bey of Oran, sent into exile
1831	Conquered by France and incorporated into French Algeria	

== See also ==
- List of Beys of the Western Beylik
- List of mayors of Oran, 1832–present
- Timeline of Oran
- Algeria
  - Heads of state of Algeria
  - Presidents of Algeria
  - Heads of government of Algeria
  - Colonial heads of Algeria
- Lists of office-holders
