= House of Zúñiga =

Noble family

Coat of arms of the House of Zúñiga

The House of Zúñiga is a Spanish noble lineage who took their name from their domain. Various members of the family were distinguished in the service of the Spanish crown in Europe and the Americas as viceroys, governors, military, diplomats, writers and members of religious orders. Charles I of Spain in 1530 named two members of the family, the Duke of Béjar and Plasencia and the Count of Miranda del Castañar, among his Immemorial Grandees, while eight members of the family were inducted into the Order of the Golden Fleece.

== Roots and Origin ==
Sancho Iñiguez (1040–1110) was alférez mayor (a hereditary court office held by high nobility of the king's banner bearer and high military commander) of Alfonso the Battler, King of Aragón and Navarre, and lord of the estate and valley of Stunica (today Zúñiga / Estuniga), located in the district of Estella in Navarre. He was the first of the lineage who called himself Sancho Iñiguez de Stunica at the beginning of the 12th century. Members of his house would later be variously known as Estunega, Estuniga, Astunica, Stunica, Estúñiga or Stúñiga.

Alvaro de Zúñiga y Guzmán, 1st Duke of Bejar and Plasencia, head of the House of Stunica/Estúñiga, castilianized the surname to Zúñiga after the pact of reconciliation with the queen of Castile and León, Isabella I (known as Isabel la Católica), signed on 10 April 1476.

== Coat of arms of the House of Zúñiga ==
The original coat of arms of the House of Zúñiga was a shield ground in gules (red) with a band in or (gold/yellow).

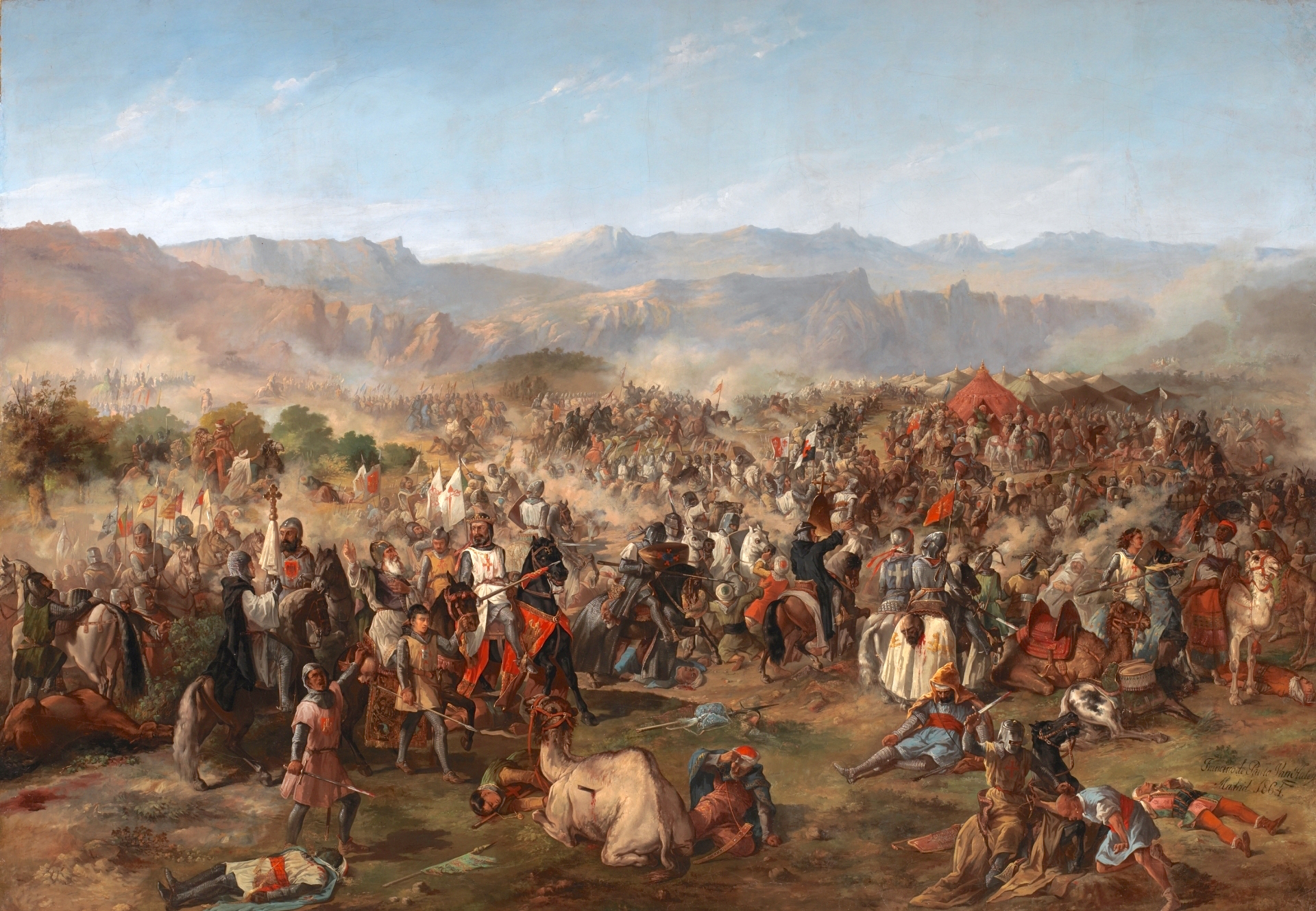
A 19th-century version of the Battle of Las Navas de Tolosa (1864) by Francisco de Paula Van Halen.

Sancho VII of Navarre changed his coat of arms to commemorate the victory at the Battle of Las Navas de Tolosa on 16 July 1212, where he and his knights defeated the Black Guard of the Almohad caliph Muhammad al-Nasir, known as Miramamolin. He changed his coat of arms from an eagle in sable (black) to a shield ground in gules (red), a chain of or (gold/yellow) with eight links, and one green emerald in its center. The chain represented the stockade composed of the Black Guard and the emerald symbolized the caliph who was known by his nickname the Green.

Official coat of arms of Navarre

The king's cousin Iñigo Ortiz de Stunica, 2nd Count of Marañón, Lord of Stunica, Mendavía and other towns, who participated with his son Diego in the defeat of the Black Guard at Las Navas de Tolosa, also changed his coat of arms adding a chain of or (gold/yellow) with eight links as border. Other knights of Navarre who participated in the defeat of the Black Guard stockade also added the chain to their coats of arms including Ramón de Peralta, Rodrigo Navarro, Ortun Diaz Urbina, Pedro Maza and Iñigo de Mendoza.

Coat of arms of the Duke of Béjar and Plasencia under the House of Zúñiga

In 1270, Iñigo Ortiz de Stunica's son Diego López de Stunica changed the coat of arms of his house to mourn the deaths of Louis IX of France and Theobald II of Navarre who both died during the Eighth Crusade called by Pope Clement IV. The coat of arms of the House of Zúñiga from 1270 onward has been a shield ground in argent (silver/white), a band of sable (black) and a chain in or (gold/yellow) with eight links as a border.

== Branches of the lineage ==
Civil war broke out in Navarre, beginning 1274, due to the quarrel over the tutelage during the minority of queen Joan I of Navarre and her matrimony with dauphin Philip IV of France the Fair, arranged by the queen mother Blanche de Artois (niece of Saint Louis IX of France). This was de facto an annexation of the Kingdom of Navarra by the crown of France. Iñigo Ortiz de Stunica (1255–1315), lord of Stunica, alférez mayor of Navarre, refused to support the queen mother and left Navarra in the end of 1274 with his whole family. They took refuge in La Rioja (Castile). The Stunica estates were seized in 1276 by the crown of Navarre. The king Alfonso X of Castile and León the Wise recognized Iñigo as rico-hombre (belonging to ancient nobility) of Castile and gave him the domains of Las Cuevas, Bañares and another villages in La Rioja. Iñigo was the progenitor of the following branches of the lineage of the House of Zuñiga:

- of Fortun Ortiz de Stunica, son of Iñigo, who returned to the Basque Country, the branches in Guipuzcoa, Álava and Navarre
- of Lope Diaz de Stunica, grandson of Iñigo, the branches of the lords of Azafra and Montalbo, counts of Hervías in La Rioja, and marquises of Tabuérniga
- of Lope Ortiz de Stunica, great-grandson of Iñigo, the branches in Andalucía
- of Fernán López de Stunica, great-grandson of Iñigo, the branches in Guadalajara
- of Diego López de Estúñiga, great-great-grandson of Iñigo, principal personage of the House of Zuniga, lord of Zúñiga and Mendavía in the Kingdom of Navarre, Las Cuevas, Bañares, Béjar, Curiel, Monterrey and another villages in the Kingdom of Castile, was the progenitor of the following further main branches of the lineage:
  - of Pedro, his firstborn son: the branch of the dukes of Béjar and Plasencia, diversified in the branches of counts of Miranda del Castañar, dukes of Peñaranda de Duero, marquises of La Bañeza, marquises of Benavente, marquises of Mirabel as well as of the branches of the dukes of Arión, of the marquises of Ayamonte, Villamanrique, Gibraleón, Aguilafuente, Valero, Alenquer and Villora
  - of Diego: the branches of the counts of Monterrey, marquises of Eliche, Monasterio, Tarazona, dukes of Medina de las Torres, and the branches of the counts of Pedrosa del Rey and marquises of Baides
  - of Iñigo: the branch of the counts of Nieva de Cameros
  - of Gonzalo: the branch of the marquises of Valencina
  - of Pedro Diego: the branch of the marquises of Flores Dávila

== Hereditary titles and hereditary court offices ==
The firstborn branch of the dukes of Béjar and Plasencia received from the kings of Spain the hereditary title of First Knight of the Kingdom and the hereditary court offices of justicia mayor y alguacil mayor of Castile (hereditary court office doing by high nobility to assume the duties of justice and interior minister).

== Immemorial Grandee ==
In the realms of the Crown of Castile and León in the early 15th century there were only fifteen powerful families known as ricohombres (high ranking nobility) of Castile and León. The House of Diego López de Estúñiga was one of them. In 1520, the year of his coronation at Aachen (Germany) as Charles V, Holy Roman Emperor, king Carlos I of Spain reorganized the title of his Kingdom of Castile and created 25 grandees, known as Inmemorial Grandees. The House of Zúñiga received two grandees, one for the duke of Béjar and another for the count of Miranda del Castañar, subrogated later on to the duke of Peñaranda de Duero.

== Military Orders of Chivalry ==
Members of the lineage proved their nobility at diverse times serving in orders of knights like the Order of Santiago, Order of Alcántara, Order of Calatrava and Order of San Juan de Jerusalén (today the Order of Malta), and as well in the Order of Carlos III of Spain.

== Distinguished members of the lineage of the House of Zuniga ==
=== Members invested in the Order of the Golden Fleece ===
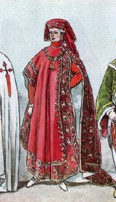
Knight of the Order of Golden Fleece

Heraldic collar for the Order of the Golden Fleece

Charles I of Spain and V of the Holy Roman Empire, Duke of Burgundy and the Sovereign Head of the Order of the Golden Fleece, invested with habit and collar of the order the following members of the House of Zuniga:

- Álvaro II de Zúñiga y Guzmán (1460) - 1531) II Duke of Béjar and Plasencia, Grandee of Castile, III count of Bañares, I marquise of Gibraleón, justicia mayor y alguacil mayor of Castile (hereditary court office doing by high nobility to assume the duties of justice and interior minister), member of the Council of State, was invested in the council celebrated in the Cathedral of Barcelona (Spain) from the 2 until the 4 of March 1519.
- Francisco de Zúñiga Avellaneda y Velasco (1475 - 1536) III Count of Miranda del Castañar, Grandee of Spain, viceroy of Navarre, majordomo mayor (court office doing by high nobility, who assume the duties of chief of the kings palace, court ceremonial and etiquette, administration of the realm patrimony) of the empress Isabel, member of the Council of State, was invested in the council celebrated in the Cathedral of Tournai (Belgium) from 3 to 5 December 1531.

By the successive kings of Spain, Sovereign Heads of the Order of the Golden Fleece, were invested with habit and collar of the order the following members of the House of Zuniga:

- Alonso Diego López de Zúñiga y Sotomayor (1578 - 1619) VI Duke of Béjar and Plasencia, Grandee of Spain, VII marquise of Gibraleón, X count of Belalcázar, VII of Bañares, X viscount of Puebla de Alcocer,. He served the kings Phillip II and Phillip III in peace and war times, with men of arms at its own expenses. He was invested on 2 January 1610.
- Francisco Diego López de Zúñiga Guzmán y Sotomayor (1596 - 1636) VII Duke of Béjar and Plasencia, Grandee of Spain, VIII marquise of Gibraleón, XI count of Belalcázar, VIII of Bañares, XI viscount of Puebla de Alcocer. He served the kings Phillip II and Phillip III in peace and war times, with men of arms at its own expenses, as captain general of the borders of Castile, Extremadura and the coast of Andalucía. He was invested on 11 June 1621.
- Alonso Diego López de Zúñiga Guzmán Sotomayor y Mendoza (1621 - 1660) VIII Duke of Béjar and Plasencia, Grandee of Spain, IV duke of Mandas and Villanueva, IX marquise of Gibraleón, IV of Terranova, XII count of Belalcázar, IX of Bañares, XII viscount of Puebla de Alcocer. He was captain general of the borders of Castile, Extremadura and the coast of Andalucía. During his command he served at his own expense with men of arms and built several forts. He was invested on 4 August 1656.
- Manuel Diego López de Zúñiga y Sotomayor (1657 - 1686) X Duke of Béjar and Plasencia, Grandee of Spain, VI duke of Mandas and Villanueva, XI marquise of Gibraleón, VI of Terranova, XIV count of Belalcázar, XI of Bañares, XIV viscount of Puebla de Alcocer. When he was eleven years old he began to serve as pikeman in Flanders. He was invested at that young age on 2 May 1668. He was a famous soldier serving in Flanders for the Spanish crown and died as a volunteer in 1686, only 29 years old, during the siege of Buddha, in Hungary now Budapest, in an assault to storm the walls and to help to re-conquer the town from the Turks
- Juan Manuel Diego López de Zúñiga y Sotomayor (1680 - 1747) XI Duke of Béjar and Plasencia, Grandee of Spain, VII duke of Mandas and Villanueva, XII marquise of Gibraleón, VII of Terranova, XV count of Belalcázar, XII of Bañares, XV viscount of Puebla de Alcocer, elected knight of the order of the Golden Fleece on 29 August 1686, when he was six years old, in commemorations of the deeds and heroic death of the duke, his father at the siege of Buddha (in Hungary now Budapest). He was majordomo mayor of the prince of Asturias Fernando VI, was invested on 9 February 1700.
- Joaquin Diego López de Zúñiga Sotomayor Castro y Portugal (1715 - 1777) XIII Duke of Béjar and Plasencia, Grandee of Spain, VIII duke of Mandas and Villanueva, XIII marquise of Gibraleón, VIII of Terranova, X of Sarria, XIV count of Belalcázar, XIII of Lemos, IX of Andrade, XI of Villalba, XIII of Bañares, XIV viscount of Puebla de Alcocer, Sommelier de Corps, tutor and majordomo mayor of the prince of Asturias Carlos IV. He was invested on 19 April 1750.

=== Other historical and famous members ===
- Juan de Zúñiga y Pimentel, (1459 - 1504) Grand Master of the Order of Alcántara, archbishop of Seville, cardinal of Spain.
- Antonio de Zúñiga y Guzmán, (1480 - 1533) Prior of Castile of the Order of Saint John of Jerusalem, viceroy of Catalonia.
- Diego López de Zúñiga y Velasco, (1500 - 1564) IV Count of Nieva de Cameros, governor of Galicia, viceroy of the Kingdom of Perú.
- Gaspar de Zúñiga y Avellaneda, (1507 - 1571) Professor of theology at Salamanca University, bishop of Segovia, archbishop of Santiago de Compostela and Seville, Cardinal of Spain.
- Luis de Requesens y Zúñiga, (1528 - 1576) Baron of Martorell and Castell-Vell, ambassador in Rome, governor of Milan and Flanders.
- Alonso de Ercilla y Zúñiga, (1533 - 1594) Author of "La Araucana".
- Juan de Zúñiga y Requesens, (1539 - 1586) Ambassador in Roma, viceroy and captain general of the Kingdom of Naples, president of the State Council.
- Gaspar de Zúñiga y Acevedo, (1560 - 1606) V Count of Monterrey, viceroy and captain general of the Kingdom of New Spain and of the Kingdom of Peru.
- Francisco de Manso Zuñiga y Sola, (1587 - 1656) I Count of Hervías; Archbishop of Burgos, of Cartagena, and of Mexico; president of the Royal and Supreme Council of the Indies.
- Diego Ortiz de Zúñiga, (1633 - 1680) Historian, writer, author of "Discurso Genealógico de los Ortices de Sevilla" and "Annales Eclesiásticos y Seculares de la Muy Noble y Muy Leal Ciudad de Sevilla...desde el año de 1246...hasta el de 1671..."
- Baltasar de Zúñiga y Guzmán, (1658 - 1727) I Duke of Arión, II marquis of Valero, viceroy of Navarra, viceroy and captain general of the Kingdom of New Spain.

== Patrimony ==
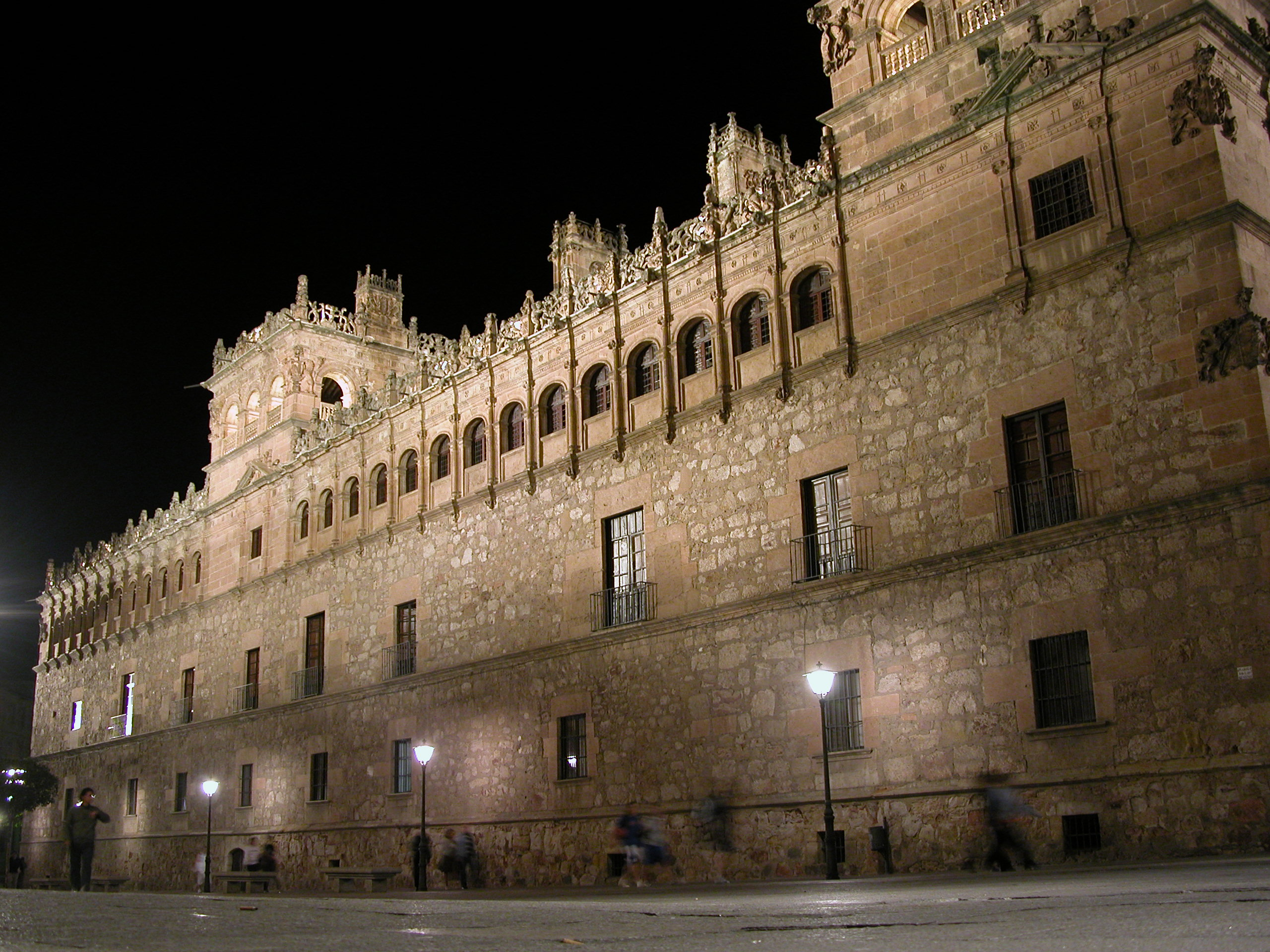
Palace of Monterrey in Salamanca

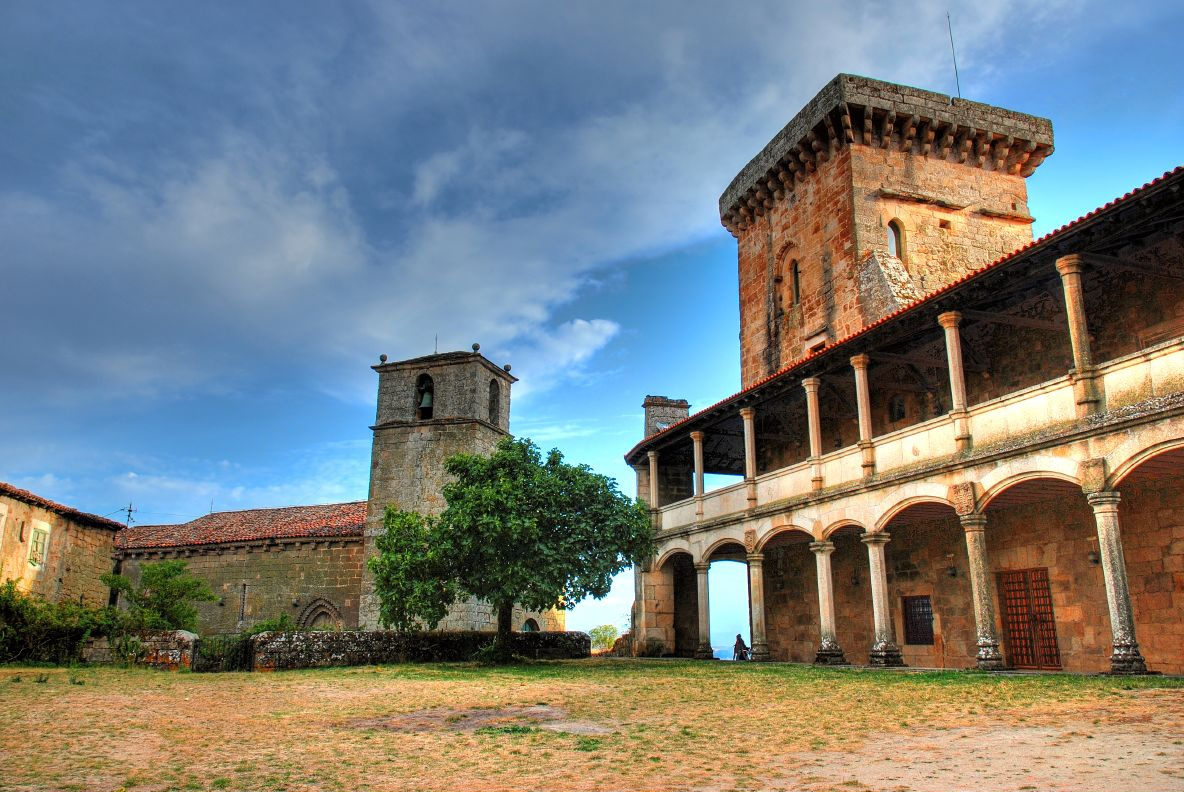
Castle of Monterrey in Verin

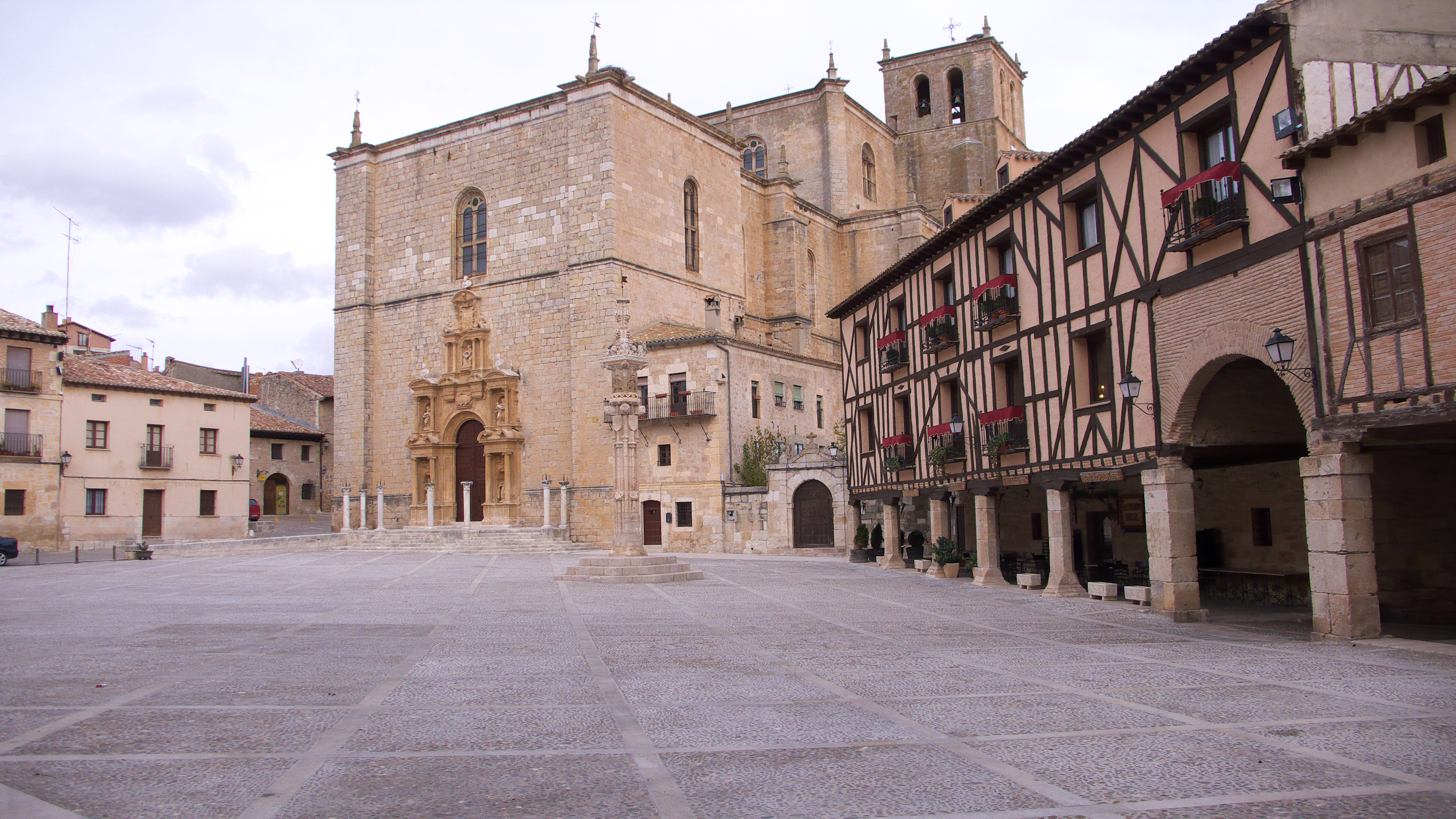
Plaza Mayor with Justice Roll of the Counts of Miranda

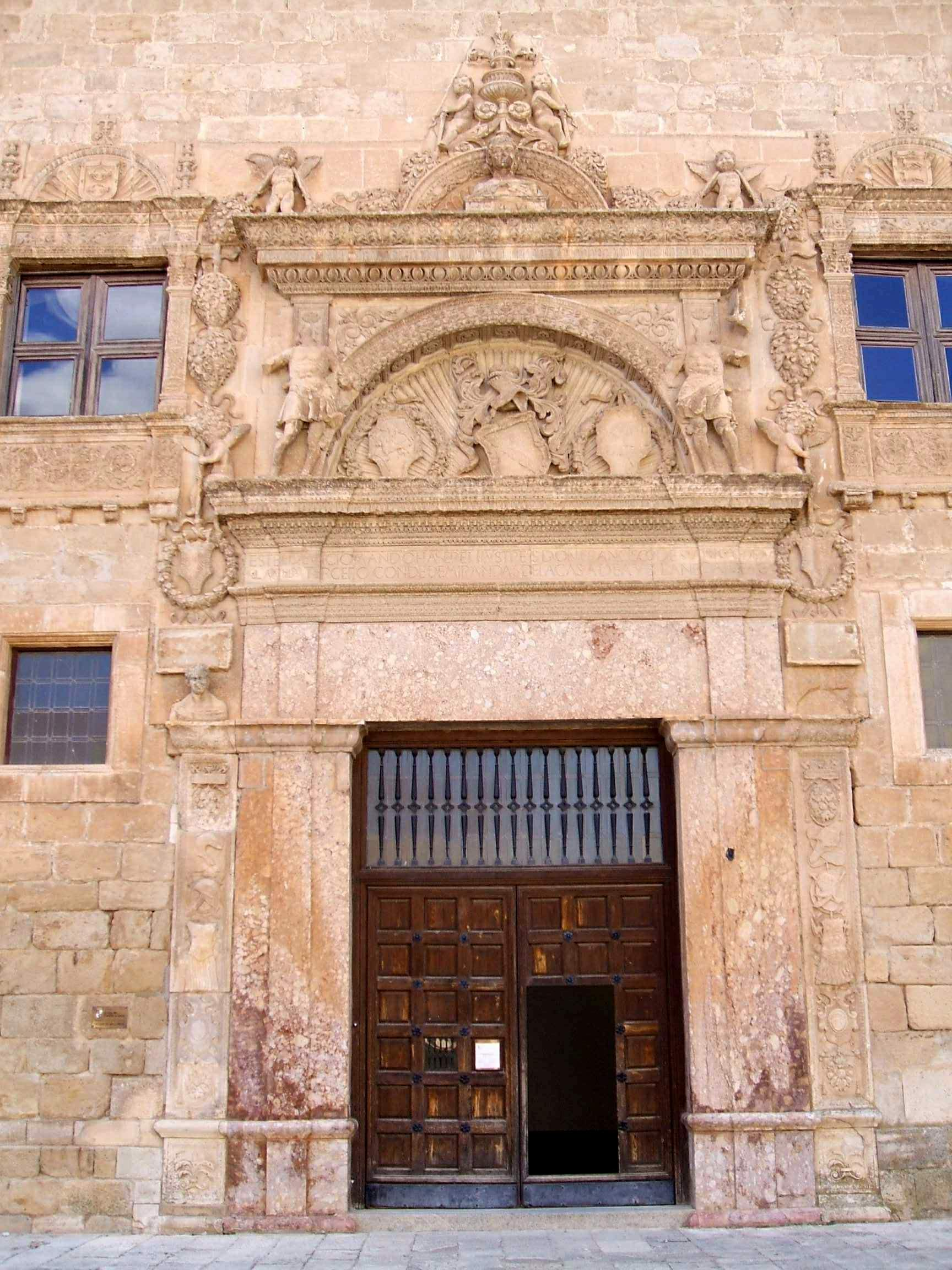
Palace of Peñaranda de Duero

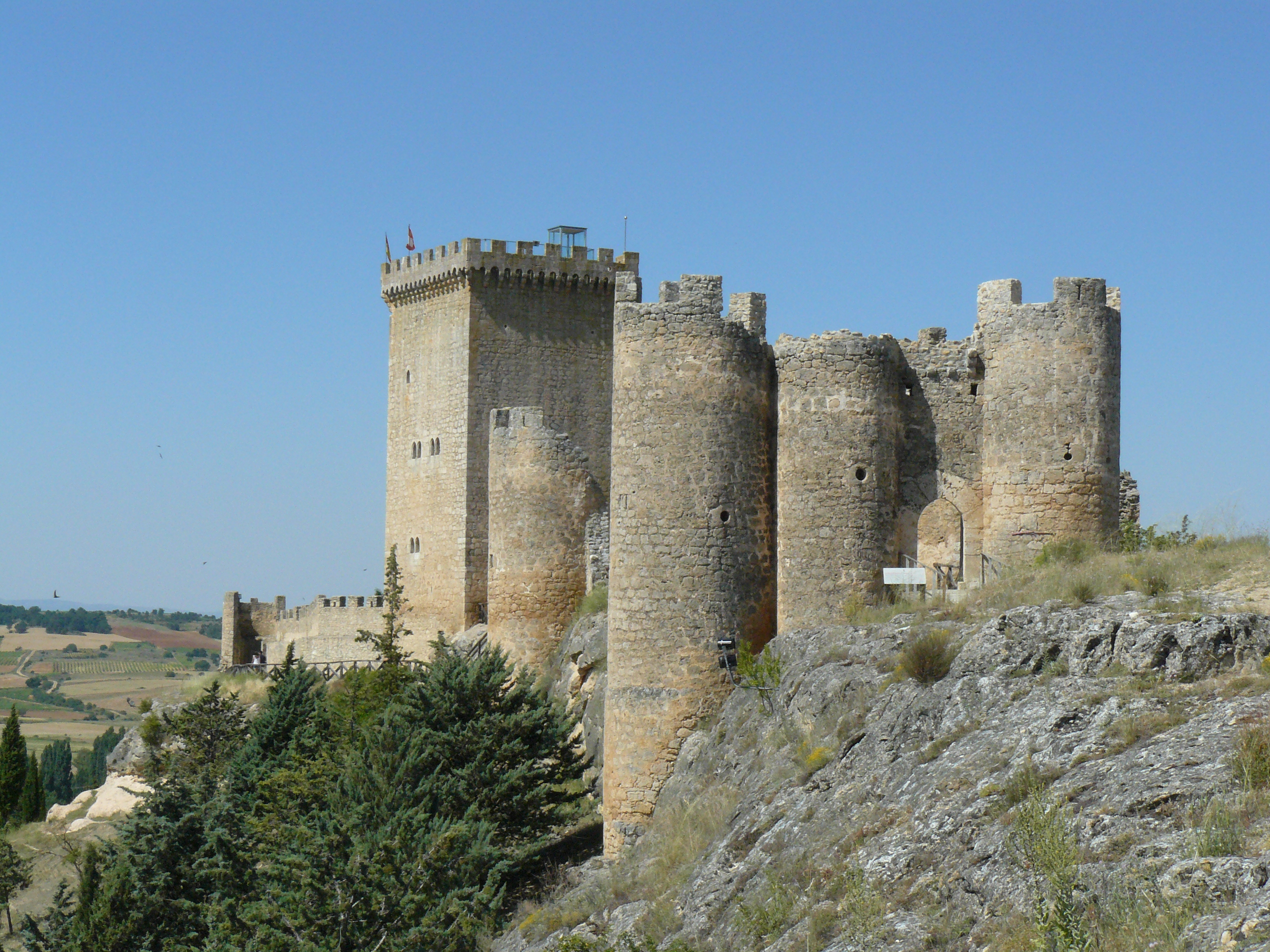
Castle of Peñaranda de Duero

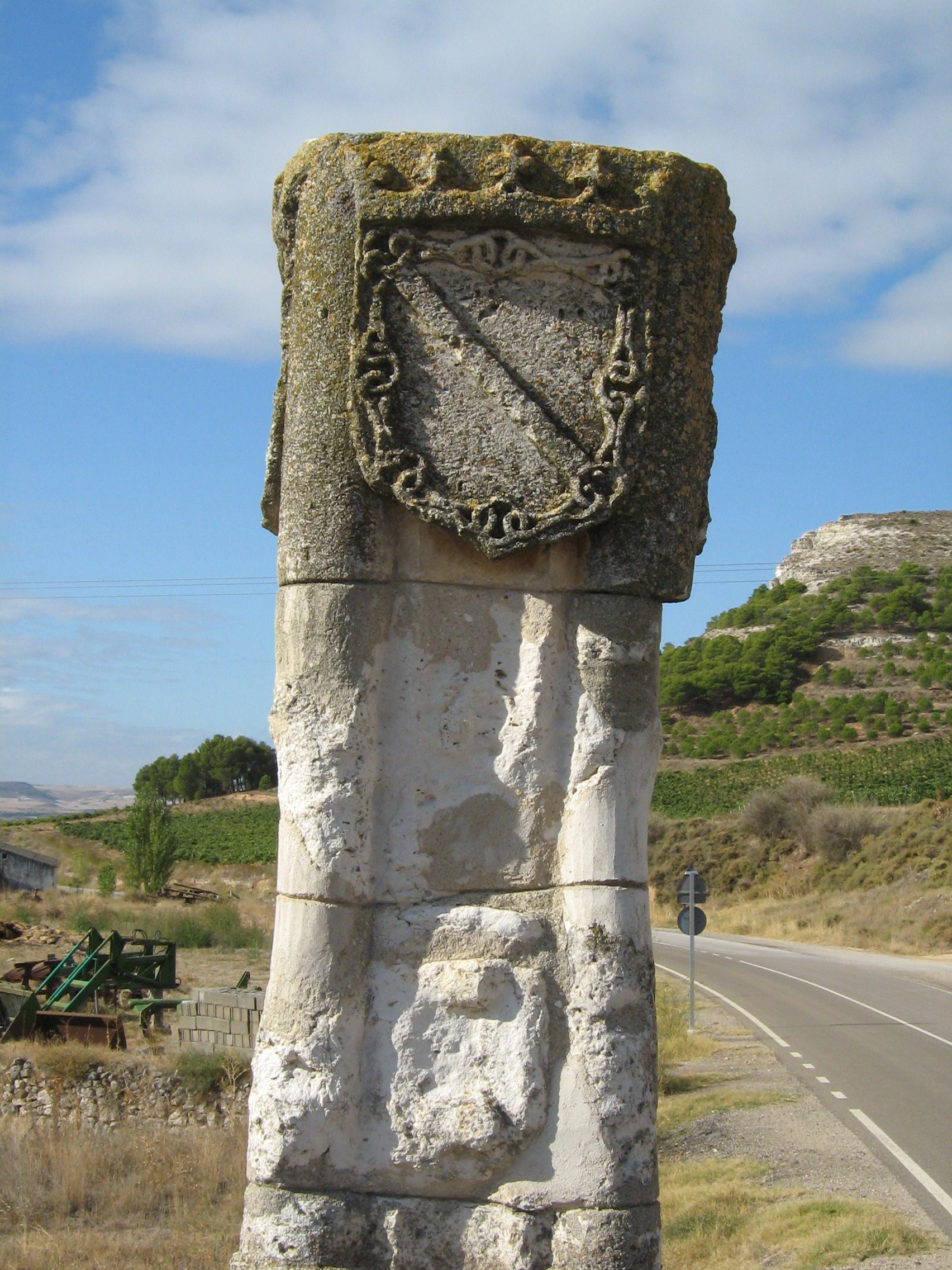
Justice Roll of the Lord of Curiel with the coats of arms of Zúñiga in Curiel de Duero

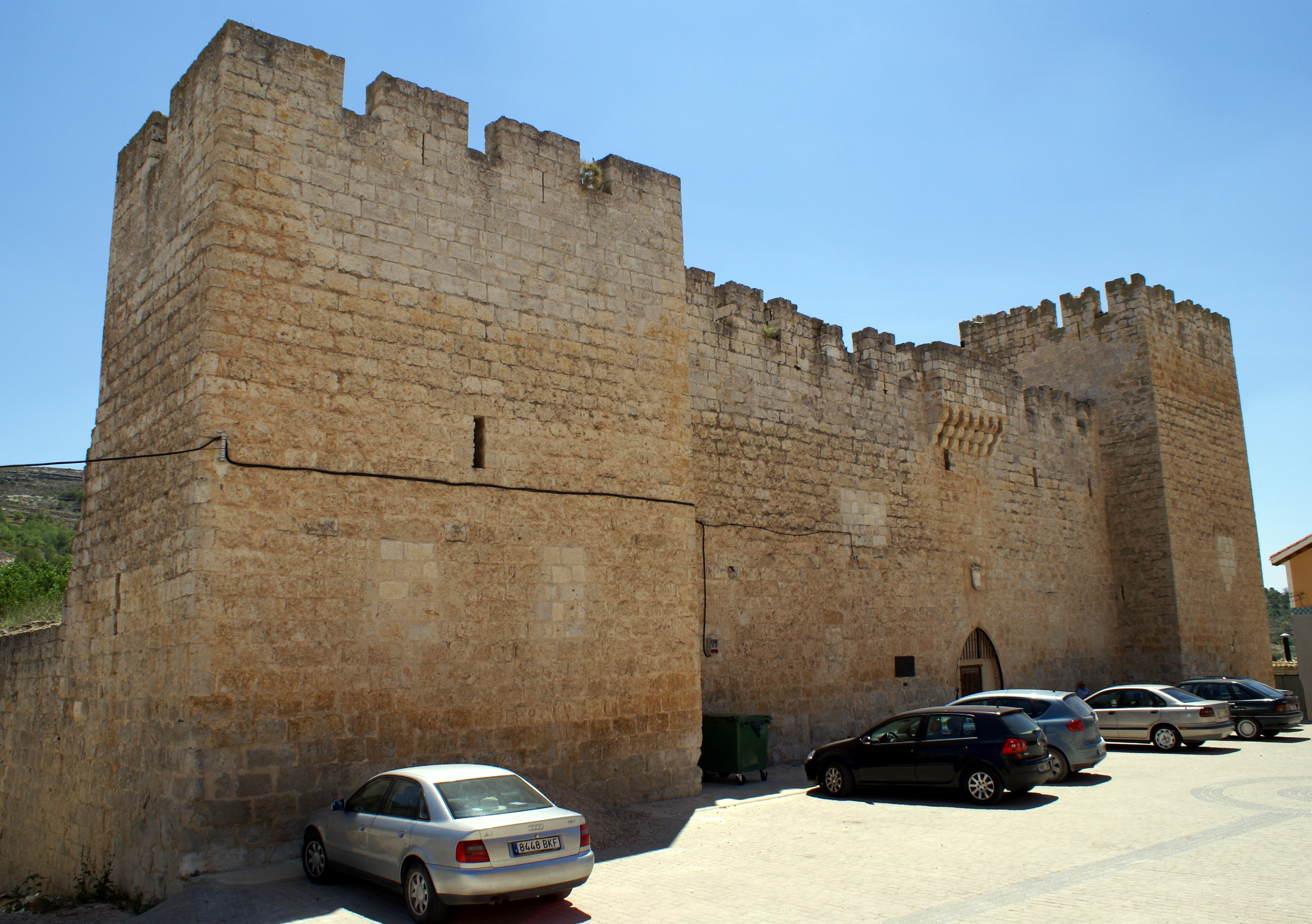
Palace of Curiel de Duero

The members of the House of Zúñiga built and rebuilt many castles and palaces in Spain, which over the time were abandoned, turned into ruins and used as building material by neighbors. Today there are only a few remnants and ruins of others, in the list below are market with (m). Also they built magnificent palaces, as patron who were among the artists of his time and are in good conditions, some of them declared national historical monuments.

- Castle of Bañares in Logroño (m) http://www.banares.org
- Castle of Clavijo in La Rioja (m) http://www.ayuntamientodeclavijo.org
- Castle of Curiel de Duero in Valladolid (m) https://www.castillodecuriel.com
- Castle of Galve de Sorbe in Guadalajara (m) https://www.galvedesorbe.com
- Castle of Iscar in Valladolid (m) http://www.villadeiscar.es
- Castle of Miranda del Castañar in Salamanca (m) https://web.archive.org/web/20120426085806/http://www.mirandadelcastanar.com/
- Castle of Monterrey in Verín https://web.archive.org/web/20120511071112/http://www.udc.es/dep/com/castellano/monte/montex.htm
- Castle of Peñaranda de Duero http://www.peñarandadeduero.es
- Castle of Polán in Toledo (m)
- Palace of Aguilafuente in Segovia (m) http://www.aguilafuenteweb.com
- Ducal Palace of Béjar in Béjar https://www.i-bejar.com
- Palace of the Forest in Béjar https://www.aytobejar.com
- Palace of the Count of Miranda in Peñaranda de Duero http://www.peñarandadeduero.es
- Palace of Curiel de Duero in Valladolid https://www.castillodecuriel.com
- Palace of the Marquis of Mirabel in Plasencia http://www.aytoplasencia.es
- Palace of Mirabel in Mirabel, Plasencia http://www.mirabel.es
  - Palace of Monterrey in Salamanca https://www.aytosalamanca.es
- Palace of Villamanrique in Villamanrique de la Condesa http://www.ayto-villamanrique.es
- Palace of Zalamea in Cáceres https://web.archive.org/web/20110902030629/http://zalamea.dip-badajoz.es/
- Palace of Zúñiga in Valladolid (m) http://www.valladolidturismo.com
- Tower of Torremontalbo in La Rioja
