= Spanish expedition to Tlemcen (1535) =

Spanish Expedition to Tlemcen
Date	June – July 1535
Location	Tlemcen
Result	Zayyanid-Banu Rashid victory

Belligerents
Kingdom of Tlemcen; Banu Rashid	Spanish Empire

Commanders and leaders
Mulay Muhammad; Mansur bin Ghani	Count Alcaudete

Units involved
Unknown	600 men

Casualties and losses
Unknown	530 killed 70 prisoners

The Spanish expedition to Tlemcen was an unsuccessful campaign led by the Spanish Empire in an attempt to install a client Zayyanid prince on the throne in Tlemcen.

== Expedition ==
The Spanish, with an objective to establish their rule in north Africa, had suffered setbacks from Muslims. In 1534, Count Alcaudete was appointed as the governor of Oran. The count sought approval from Spain to atone for his defection and deal with Algerian tribes. The count arrived at the Banu 'Amir tribe; their chief was Abdulrahman bin Ridwan, who was preparing a campaign to depose the Zayyanid Sultan, Muhammad, and replace him with his younger brother, Abdulla. Bin Ridwan sought Spanish help and agreed to become Spanish tributary. Seeing the chance to establish Spanish authority, the Count agreed to support him and dispatched a force of 600 men. After initial success, many tribes declared loyalty to the Spanish. The Spanish expedition almost succeeded; however, on their way back, the Spanish troops were stationed at Tibda fortress, where they were attacked by the Banu Rashid chief and the Sultan vizier, Mansur bin Ghani. The Spanish troops were trapped and majority of them were killed. Only 70 prisoners survived.
