= Francisco de Tutavilla y del Rufo, Duque de San Germán =

Italian-Spanish military man and Viceroy

General Francisco Tuttavilla Duke of San Germán
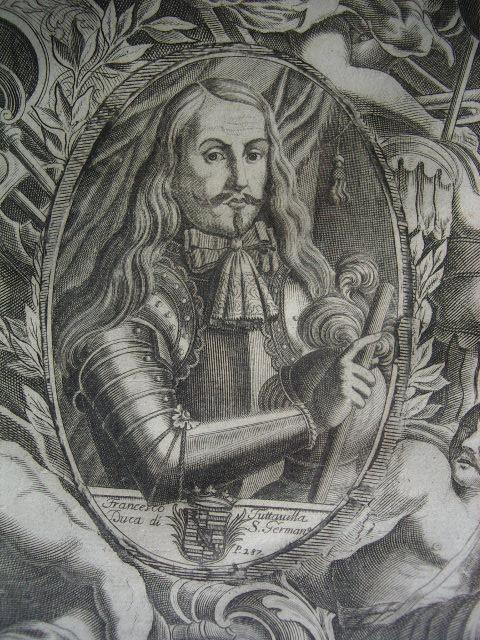
- Francisco Tuttavilla, Duke of San Germán. Unknown author.
- Born: Francisco de Tutavilla y del Tufo; 1604; Naples, Kingdom of Naples, Spanish Empire
- Died: 30 January 1679 (aged 74–75); Madrid, Crown of Castile, Spanish Empire
- Spouse: Catalina de Cárdenas
- Relatives: Octavio de Tutavila (father); Porfía del Rufo (mother)
- Military career
- Allegiance: (Spain) Spanish Empire
- Branch: (Spain) Spanish Army
- Service years: 1630s–1675
- Rank: General
- Conflicts: Franco-Spanish War (1635–1659): Reapers' War; Battle of Cuatro Pilans; Siege of Lérida; Relief of Balaguer; Attack of Avellanas; Portuguese Restoration War: Siege of Olivenza and Monção; Siege of Badajoz; Conquest of Evora; Battle of Ameixial; Battle of the Lines of Elvas; Franco-Dutch War: Siege of Bellegarde Fort; Battle of Maureillas

Governor of Extremadura
- In office 1650–1661
- Monarch: Philip IV
- Preceded by: Diego Felípez de Guzmán
- Succeeded by: John Joseph of Austria

Viceroy of Navarre
- In office 21 April 1664 – 15 November 1667
- Monarchs: Philip IV; Charles II
- Regent: Mariana of Austria
- Preceded by: Antonio Pedro Sancho Dávila y Osorio
- Succeeded by: Diego Caballero de Illescas y Cabeza de Vaca

Viceroy of Sardinia
- In office 1668 – Until 1673
- Monarch: Charles II
- Regent: Mariana of Austria
- Preceded by: Bernardo Matías de Cervelló
- Succeeded by: Fernando Joaquín Fajardo de Requeséns y Zúñiga

Viceroy of Catalonia
- In office 17 August 1673 – October 1675
- Monarch: Charles II
- Regent: Mariana of Austria
- Preceded by: Francisco Fernández de Córdoba
- Succeeded by: Juan Antonio Pacheco Osorio Toledo

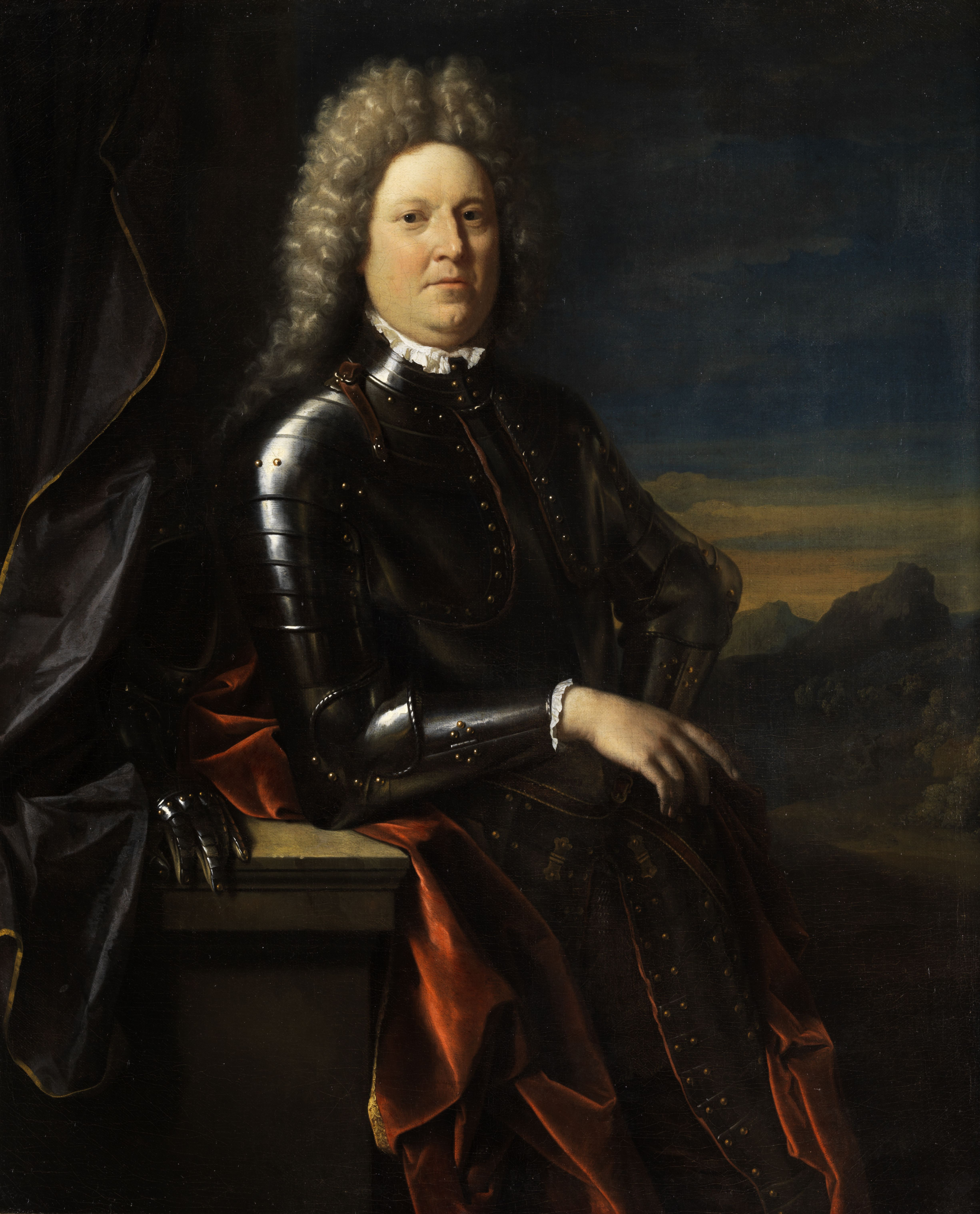
Frederick Schomberg, 1st Duke of Schomberg, former adviser to the Portuguese Restoration War, reconquered Bellegarde Fort in 1675, near the actual French-Spanish frontier at Le Perthus, captured in 1674 by Francisco de Tutavilla y del Rufo, Duke of San Germán

Francisco de Tutavilla y del Tufo, Duque de San Germán, (Naples, Italy, 1604 – Madrid, Spain, 30 January 1679), Commander of Peñausende from the Spanish Military Order of Santiago and Sieur of Campana de Albalá and Saucedilla, was an Italian - Spanish military and Viceroy, serving Kings Philip IV of Spain and Charles II of Spain.

== Biography ==
At the time of the Portuguese Restoration War, 1657–1663, he was a General of the Extremadura Army fighting at the Sieges of Olivenza, Badajoz and Monção. His troops were defeated at Elvas, in 1659, and heavily defeated at Ameixial, in 1663, which ended his participation in the campaign of Portugal.

From April 1664 until February 1668, he was Viceroy of Navarre. At the end of 1668, he was the successor of the assassinated Viceroy of Sardinia, Manuel de los Cobos, 4th Marquis of Camarasa, a post he held until January 1673. He then became Viceroy of Catalonia, (August 1673 - October 1675).

In 1674 he captured the Fort de Bellegarde, held by the French since the Peace of the Pyrenees of 1659 between France and Spain, and won the Battle of Maureillas over a French army led by Frederick Schomberg, 1st Duke of Schomberg. The eruption of a revolt in Messina against the Spanish rule in 1675, however, forced him to send many of his troops to suppress the rebellion, and Schomberg was able to take back Bellegarde.

Duke Francisco de Tutavilla y del Tufo was married to a Spanish noblewoman, mainly of Portuguese ancestors, Catalina de Cárdenas Colón de Toledo y Portugal, 14th Countess of la Puebla del Maestre and 5th Marchioness of Bacares, who died in Madrid on 4 January 1701. The couple had no children.
