= Banu Rashid =

Tribe of the modern area of Algeria

The Banu Rashid were a tribe of the modern area of Algeria, near the city of Oran. They entered into sporadic alliance with Spain, when faced with the threat of Ottoman expansion. In 1535 the Banu Rashid helped the Zayyanids defeat a Spanish expedition against Tlemcen.
