= List of viceroys of Navarre =

This is a list of Spanish Viceroys of Navarre from 1512 to 1840, when the function was abolished.

- 1512 : Diego Fernández de Córdoba y Arellano, marqués de Comares
- 1515 : Fadrique de Acuña, Conde de Buendía
- 1516 : Antonio Manrique de Lara, Duque de Nájera
- 1521 : Francisco de Zuñiga, 3rd Count of Miranda
- 1524 : Diego de Avellaneda, Bishop of Tuy
- 1527 : Martín Alfonso Fernández de Córdoba, Conde de Alcaudete
- 1534 : Diego Hurtado de Mendoza, 2nd Marquis of Cañete
- 1542 : Juan de Vega, Señor de Grajal
- 1543 : Luis Hurtado de Mendoza, 2nd Marquess of Mondéjar
- 1546 : Álvar Gómez Manrique de Mendoza, Conde de Castrogeriz
- 1547 : Luís de Velasco, Señor de Salinas
- 1549 : Bernardino de Cárdenas y Pacheco, Duque de Maqueda
- 1552 : Beltrán de la Cueva, 3rd Duke of Alburquerque
- 1560 : Gabriel de la Cueva, 5th Duke of Alburquerque
- 1564 : Alfonso de Córdoba y Velasco, 2nd Conde de Alcaudete
- 1565 : José de Guevara y Tovar, Señor de Escalante
- 1567 : Juan de la Cerda y Silva, 4th Duke of Medinaceli
- 1572 : Vespasiano Gonzaga y Colonna, Prínce of Sabbioneta
- 1575 : Sancho Martínez de Leiva, Señor de Leiva
- 1579 : Francisco Hurtado de Mendoza, Marqués de Almazán
- 1589 : José Martín de Córdoba y Velasco, Marqués de Cortes
- 1595 : Juan de Cardona y Requesens, Baron de Sant Boi
- 1602 : Mateo de Burgos, Bishop of Pamplona (interim)
- 1603 : Juan de Cardona y Requesens, Baron de Sant Boi (2nd term)
- 1610 : Alonso Idiáquez de Butrón, Duque de Ciudad Real
- 1618 : Felipe Ramírez de Arellano, Conde de Aguilar
- 1620 : Juan de Mendoza y Velasco, Marqués de Hinojosa
- 1623 : Bernardino González de Avellaneda, Marqués de Castrillo
- 1629 : Fernando Girón, Duque de Nemeses
- 1629 : Juan Carlos de Guzmán y Silva, Marqués de Fuentes
- 1631 : Luis Bravo Acuña
- 1634 : Francisco González de Andía-Irarrázabal, Marqués de Valparaíso
- 1637 : Fernando de Andrade y Sotomayor, Archbishop of Burgos
- 1638 : Pedro Fajardo Requesens y Zúñiga, Marqués de los Vélez
- 1640 : Francesco Maria Carafa y Carafa, 5th Duke of Duke of Nochera
- 1641 : Enrique Pimentel, 5th Marqués de Tabara
- 1641 : Sebastián Suárez de Mendoza, Conde de La Coruña
- 1643 : Duarte Fernando Álvarez de Toledo, Conde de Oropesa
- 1645 : Andrea Cantelmo, (1598–1645), a son of Giuseppe, (4th Duke of Popoli), Governor of Luxembourg before 1634.
- 1646 : Luis de Guzmán Ponce de Leon
- 1649 : Diego López Pacheco, 7th Duke of Escalona
- 1653 : Diego de Benavides, 8th Count of Santisteban
- 1661 : Antonio Álvarez de Toledo y Enriquez de Ribera, 7th Duke of Alba, 5th Marqués de Villanueva del Río, Knight of the Order of the Golden Fleece.
- 1662 : Antonio Pedro Sancho Dávila y Osorio, Marqués de la Villa de San Román
- 1664 : Francisco de Tutavilla y del Rufo, Duque de San Germán
- 1667 : Diego Caballero de Illescas y Cabeza de Vaca
- 1671 : Alexander Farnese, Prince of Parma
- 1676 : Antonio de Velasco y Ayala, Conde de Fuensalida
- 1681 : Íñigo de Velandia Arce y Arellano
- 1684 : Diego Dávila Mesía y Guzmán, 3rd Marquis of Leganés
- 1684 : Enrique de Benavides de la Cueva y Bazán, Marqués de Bayona
- 1685 : Ernesto Alejandro de Ligné y Croy, Príncipe de Chimay
- 1686 : Alejandro de Bournonville, Duque de Bournonville
- 1691 : Juan Manuel Fernández Pacheco Cabrera, Duque de Escalona
- 1692 : Baltasar de Zúñiga y Guzmán, Marqués de Valero
- 1697 : Juan Carlos de Batevile, Marqués de Conflans
- 1698 : Pedro Álvarez de Vega, Conde de Grajal
- 1699 : Domingo Pignatelli y Vagher, Marqués de San Vicente
- 1702 : Luis Francisco Benavides y Aragón, marqués de Solera
- 1706 : Fernando de Moncada y Aragón, Duque de San Juan
- 1706 : Alberto Octavio Tserclaes de Tilly
- 1709 : Fernando de Moncada y Aragón, duque de San Juan
- 1712 : Pedro Colón de Portugal y Ayala, duque de Veragua
- 1713 : Tomás de Aquino, príncipe de Castiglione
- 1722 : Gonzalo Chacón y Orellana
- 1723 : Cristóbal de Moscoso y Montemayor, conde de Las Torres
- 1739 : Antonio Pedro Nolasco de Lanzós y Taboada, conde de Maceda
- 1749 : Jean Thierry du Mont, comte de Gages
- 1754 : Fray Manuel de Sada y Antillón, gran capellán de Amposta
- 1760 : Juan Francisco Güemes y Orcasitas, conde de Revillagigedo
- 1760 : Luis Carlos González de Albelda y Cayro, marqués del Cairo
- 1765 : Honore Ignace de Glymes- Brabante, count of Glymes
- 1765 : Ambrosio de Funes Villalpando, count of Ricla
- 1768 : Alonso Vicente de Solís y Folch de Cardona, duque de Montellano
- 1773 : Francisco Bucarelli y Ursúa
- 1780 : Manuel Azlor y Urriés
- 1788 : Martín Álvarez de Sotomayor y Soto Flores, conde de Colomera
- 1795 : Pablo de Sangro y Merode, príncipe de Castelfranco
- 1796 : Joaquín de Fondesviela y Undiano
- 1798 : Jerónimo Morejón Girón-Moctezuma, marqués de Las Amarillas
- 1807 : José Miguel de Carvajal y Manrique de Lara Polanco, duque de San Carlos
- 1807 : Leopoldo de Gregorio y Paterno, marqués de Vallesantoro
- 1808 : Francisco Javier Negrete y Adorno, conde de Campo Alange
- 1808 : Luis Antonio Bertón des Balbes, duque de Mahón
  - 1810–1813 : No viceroy; replaced by a French military governor
- 1814 : José Manuel de Ezpeleta, 1st Count of Ezpeleta de Beire
  - 1820–1823 : No viceroy during the Trienio Liberal
- 1823 : Carlos de España y Couserans de Cominges,
- 1823 : Luis Rebolledo de Palafox, 4th Marquis of Lazán
- 1824 : Juan Ruiz de Apodaca, 1st Count of Venadito
- 1826 : Prudencio de Guadalfajara y Aguilera, conde de Castroterreño
- 1830 : Manuel Llauder y Camín, marqués del Valle de Rivas
- 1832 : Antonio Solá de Figueras
- 1834 : Pedro Sarsfield y Waters, conde de Sarsfield
- 1834 : Jerónimo Valdés
- 1834 : Vicente Genaro de Quesada
- 1834 : José Ramón Rodil, 1st Marquis of Rodil
- 1834 : Francisco Espoz y Mina
- 1834 : Manuel Lorenzo
- 1835 : Luis Fernández de Córdova
- 1835 : Jerónimo Valdés
- 1835 : Ramón de Meer y Kindelán, barón de Meer
- 1835 : Pedro Sarsfield y Waters, conde de Sarsfield
- 1836 : Ramón de Meer y Kindelán, barón de Meer
- 1836 : Pedro Sarsfield y Waters, conde de Sarsfield
- 1836 : Francisco Cabrera
- 1836 : Baldomero Espartero, Prince of Vergara
- 1836 : Joaquín Ezpeleta Enrile
- 1837 : Martín José Iriarte
- 1837 : Manuel Latre
- 1838 : Isidro de Alaix Fábregas
- 1838 : Diego de León, 1st Count of Belascoáin
- 1839 : Felipe Ribero y Lemoine

== Sources ==
- Virreinato de Navarra
