= Diego Fernández de Córdoba y Arellano, 1st Marquis of Comares =

Diego Fernández de Córdoba y Arellano, 1st Marquis of Comares, (1463 – Oran, now in Algeria, 1518), invested 1st Marquis of Comares in 1512, was Governor of Oran and Mazalquivir, 1509–1512 and 1516–1518, and first Viceroy of Navarre, 1512–1515.

He was the son of Martín Fernández de Córdoba y de Sotomayor, born circa 1420, 4th Sieur of Chillon, province of Ciudad Real, 10th Sieur of Espejo, 5th Sieur of Lucena and Leonor de Arellano y Fernandez de Cordoba, (1446–1531). His maternal uncle was the famous army commander Gonzalo Fernández de Córdoba, (1453–1515).

He married, circa 1480, Juana Pacheco y Portocarrero, a daughter of Juan Pacheco 1st Duke of Escalona (1419–1474), a notorious political troublemaker and his first wife, Lady Maria Portocarrero y Enriquez-Mendoza, (circa 1430 - 1470), 6th Lady of Moguer from a powerful shipowners family.

In 1482 he played an important role in the conquest of the fortress of Alhama de Granada, belonging to the Moorish Kingdom of Granada, and in 1483 in repelling the attacks of king Boabdil on Lucena, a town in the province of Cordoba, held by the Kingdom of Castile.

After the conquest of the Kingdom of Granada in 1492, he took part in 1501 in crushing the moriscos revolt in the Sierra de los Filabres, province of Almeria conquering the village of Velefique. In 1505, he conquered Mazalquivir and took part in the Spanish conquest of Oran, now in Algeria.

In 1506 he was involved in the protests by the Andalusian Nobility in Cordoba, on 6 October 1506, against overzealous Inquisitor Diego Rodriguez de Lucero, protesting against Lucero's behavior in front of General Inquisitor Diego de Deza. On this day there were also riots by an angry mob, who liberated the prisoners from the Córdoba prison. Lawsuits were brought against the inter-racial hate seeking preaches by Lucero, who himself was put in prison and investigated by the new General Inquisitor and Cardinal Francisco Jiménez de Cisneros.

Diego also lost his assignment as a Governor in Oran and Mazalquivir, and some of the castles belonging to the "Fernández de Córdoba" main Aguilar line, were destroyed, for his part in the rebellion. Diego was sent to Pamplona, capital of the Kingdom of Navarre to quell the troops loyal to John III of Albret, who tried to fend off the Castilian-Aragonese invasion of the kingdom in 1512.

After the successful conclusion of this military campaign, Diego was awarded the title of Marquis de Comares in 1512 and he became the first Viceroy of Navarre. In 1516 he was appointed to North Africa, where he was again Spanish Governor of Oran and Mazalquivir, till he died there in 1518.

His, only son was Luis Fernández de Córdoba y Pacheco, 2nd Marquis of Comares (1482–1564), who succeeded him as Governor of Oran. He married Francisca Fernández de Córdoba y de Zúñiga, daughter of Diego, 3rd Count of Cabra, having three daughters and one son.
