= Timeline of Oran =

The following is a timeline of the history of the city of Oran, Algeria.

== Prior to 19th century ==
- 903 CE – Ouahran founded by Andalusian Umayyad traders (traditional date).
- 13th century – Zayyanids in power.
- 1415 - Portugal captures Oran
- 1492 – Andalusian refugees flee to Oran (approximate date).
- 1509 – Spanish conquest.
- 1556 – Siege of Oran (1556) by Ottoman forces.
- 1563 – Sieges of Oran and Mers El Kébir by Ottoman forces.
- 1604 – Fort Santa Cruz built.
- 1669 – Jews expelled.
- 1708 – Algerian first reconquest of Oran.
- 1732 – Spanish reconquest.
- 1738 – Population: 9,000.
- 1785 – Population: 12,000.
- 1790 – October 9: 1790 Oran earthquake.
- 1792 – Algerian second reconquest of Oran.
- 1792 – Bey Mohamed El-Kebir Mosque built.
- 1794 – Plague outbreak.
- 1796 – Hassan Pasha Mosque built.

== 19th century ==
- 1831 – Pujol appointed mayor of Oran.
- 1834 – Treaty of Desmichel with the governor of French Algeria and Emir Abdelkader in Oran in secret from France who denied the treaty later.
- 1836 – General Létang transforms the glacis Castle-Nine into a walk which bears its name.
- 1837 – General Bugeaud arrived in Oran to negotiate a new treaty (The Treaty of Tafna, May 20) with Emir Abd El-Kader. On November 14 the Emir signed a treaty with Desmichel recognizing its [whose?] authority to the west of Algiers except for Oran, Mostaganem and Arzew.
- 1845 – General Lamoricière constructed the "Village Nègre."
- 1847 – Following a severe drought lasting several months, a terrible epidemic of cholera strikes, decimating the population of Oran.
- 1847 - January 1: 47,300 French people had come from Alsace, the Vosges, Dauphiné and the south of France at the same time as 31,000 Spaniards, 8,800 Maltese, 8,200 Italians and 8,600 Swiss and Germans who were believed to be the worst settlers.
- 1848
  - Algiers-Oran railway begins operating.
  - Oran becomes the prefecture of the administrative department of the same name.
  - Creation of the small Basin of the Old Port (four hectares).
  - A civil hospital is built.
- 1849 – Cholera outbreak.
- 1850 – Chapelle de Santa Cruz (church) construction begins atop Aïdour.
- 1851 - 30,258 inhabitants in Oran.
- 1858 – December 5: The members of the first general council of Oran, named by Emperor Napoleon III, meet with the prefecture, with Jules de Pre de Saint-Maur as chairman.
- 1862 – Slaughterhouse built.
- 1865 - Napoleon III grants French nationality to Jews and Muslims. This decree was very frowned upon by the settlers and it was not until October 24, 1870 that the Crémieux decree actually allowed 37,000 Jews from Algeria to become citizens of France.
- 1866 – Roman Catholic Diocese of Oran established.
- 1876 - 45,640 inhabitants in Oran.
- 1877 – University Hospital of Oran construction begins.
- 1878 – Société de Géographie et d’Archéologie d’Oran founded.
- 1880
  - Great Synagogue of Oran built.
  - Oran builds a great extension starting from the place d'Armes. The ravine of l'Oued Rouina is filled.
- 1881 – Horse-drawn tram begins operating.
- 1885 – Municipal Museum of Oran and Demaeght established. 63,929 inhabitants in Oran.
- 1886 – Hôtel de ville d'Oran (city hall) built.
- 1899 – Electric tram begins operating.
- 1900 – Population: 93,000.

== 20th century ==
=== 1900s–1940s ===
- 1906 - Population: 101,009 inhabitants.
- 1907 – Construction of the theatre.
- 1909 – December 14: the first flight in Oran is carried out by Julien Serviès on a Sommer monoplane at Sénia,. Next 9 January, a great meeting gathers forty thousand people, also in Sénia, in the presence of Marshal Lyautey.
- 1911 - Population: 118,023 inhabitants.
- 1912 – Population: 123,086.
- 1913 – Cathedral Sacré Coeur built.
- 1917 – MC Oran football club founded under the name of Mouloudia Club Musulman Oranais (Mouloudia Muslim Club of Oran).
- 1921 - Population: 138,212 inhabitants.
- 1926 - Population: 145,183 inhabitants.
- 1927 – Habib Bouakeul Stadium built under the name of Alenda Stadium. It changed the name to Vincent Monréal Stadium in 1948 before becomming under the present name after the independence of Algeria.
- 1928 – Oran socialiste newspaper begins publication.
- 1930 – Creation of new districts, less dense and more luxurious: these included higher Gambetta, Bon Reception, the Beavers, Médioni, Small Boulanger, Cité... This development continues overall with the creation of districts even more sumptuous, overflowing the first crown (district of Saint-Hubert, Palm trees, Point of the Day, Gambetta...)
- 1930–32 – Sénia, the Oran aérodrome, is where several world records of duration and distance in closed loop are established.
- 1931 - Population: 187,981.
- 1936 - Population: 217,819 inhabitants in Oran. On August 1, 1936, the French designer and couturier Yves Saint Laurent was born in Oran.
- 1936 - The number of Moroccans in the department of Oran is 19,902, of which 4,395 lived in the city of Oran.
- 1940
  - Beginning of the construction of the new prefecture.
  - July 3: following the German invasion of Paris and fall of France, the British fleet attacked from Gibraltar, damaging the French fleet of the Atlantic based at Mers el Kébir. Its bombardment sank three battleships: Dunkerque, Provence and Bretagne. Twelve hundred French sailors died as a result. The British feared that the French fleet could be taken over and used against them. The Vichy government operated in Algeria.
- 1942 – November 8: as prelude to the invasion of Italy, the British and the Americans land at Arzew, and Oran capitulates on November 10.
- 1947 – Camus' fictional novel The Plague published.
- 1948 – Population: 244,594.
- 1949 – OS attack post office.

=== 1950s–1990s ===
- 1950 – Oran has 256,661 inhabitants. Sixty-five percent of the Europeans were of Spanish origin, and they outnumbered the Algerian Muslims in the city.
- 1951 – Dairy built.
- 1955 – Trefle Apartments (hi-rise) built.
- 1957 – Parc Municipal des Sports (stadium) opens.
- 1958 – June 6: French president de Gaulle visits city.
- 1960
  - Resistance fighters put up their first barricades.
  - Palais des Sports Hamou Boutlélis (arena) opens.
- 1961
  - August: appearance of the Organisation armée secrète.
  - The census states the population of Oran 400,000 inhabitants: 220,000 Europeans (including many born in Algeria) and 180,000 Algerian Muslims.
- 1962
  - 25 March: Edmond Jouhaud, a chief of the Organisation armée secrète, arrested.
  - 5 July: City becomes part of independent Algeria.
  - 5–7 July: Massacre of Europeans occurs. Most survivors of French ancestry left the city, fleeing to France.
- 1965 – University of Oran established.
- 1966 – Population: 327,493.
- 1975 – Abdallah Ibn Salam Mosque established.
- 1977 – Population: 490,788 city; 543,485 urban agglomeration.
- 1985 – Raï music festival held.
- 1988 – 1988 October Riots.
- 1992 – National Centre of Research in Social and Cultural Anthropology headquartered in Oran.
- 1994
  - Le Quotidien d'Oran newspaper begins publication.
  - 12 administrative urban areas created: El-Badr, Bouamama, El-Emir, El-Hamri, El-Houari, El-Makkari, El-Menzeh, Muhieddine, El-Othmania, Es-Saada, and Es-Seddikia.
- 1998 – Population: 705,335.

== 21st century ==
- 2007 – Sonatrach HQ building constructed.
- 2008
  - Bahia Center (hi-rise) built.^{(fr)}
  - Population: 1,165,687.
- 2013 – Oran Tramway begins operating.
- 2014 – Renault car manufactory begins operating.
- 2017 – 6 additional administrative urban areas created: Akid Lotfi, Ed-Derb, Fellaoucène, Hammou Boutlélis, El-Khaldia, and Mahieddine.
- 2021 – 2021 Mediterranean Games to be held in Oran.

== See also ==
- Oran history
- History of Oran
- List of governors of Oran, 1509–1831 (Spanish and Ottoman periods)
- List of mayors of Oran, 1832–present (includes French period)
- History of the Jews in Oran
- Timelines of other cities in Algeria: Algiers
- Years in Algeria

== Bibliography ==
- Gerhard Rohlfs (1893). "Algier und Oran". Westermann's illustrierte deutsche Monatshefte (in German). 73. Braunschweig.

=== In English ===
- R. Lambert Playfair (1895), "City of Oran", Handbook for Travellers in Algeria and Tunis (5th ed.), London: J. Murray, OCLC 4443952
- "Oran", Cook's Practical Guide to Algiers, Algeria and Tunisia, London: T. Cook & Son, 1904
- "Oran", The Mediterranean: Seaports and Sea Routes, including Madeira, the Canary Islands, the Coast of Morocco, Algeria, and Tunisia, Leipzig: Karl Baedeker, 1911, OCLC 490068
- Bruce E. Stanley; Michael R.T. Dumper, eds. (2008), "Oran", Cities of the Middle East and North Africa, US: ABC-CLIO, p. 289+, ISBN 978-1-57607-920-1
- Joshua Schreier (2012). "Creation of the 'Israélite indigène' Jewish merchants in early colonial Oran". Journal of North African Studies. 17 (5): 757–772. doi:10.1080/13629387.2012.723428. ISSN 1362-9387. S2CID 144299440.
- Joshua Schreier. The Merchants of Oran: A Jewish Port at the Dawn of Empire. Stanford Studies in Jewish History and Culture Series.; Stanford Stanford University Press, 2017. 216 pp. ,ISBN 978-0-8047-9914-0.
- Claire Marynower (2013). "Full place of power: interwar Oran, the French empire's bullring?". Journal of North African Studies. 18 (5): 690–702. doi:10.1080/13629387.2013.849895. S2CID 144391192.

=== In French ===
- G. Seguy (1888). "Oran". In Association française pour l'avancement des sciences (ed.). Oran et l'Algérie en 1887: notices historiques, scientifiques, & economiques (in French). Oran: Paul Perrier. pp. 19–78.
- Ch. Brossard, ed. (1906). "Oran: Description des villes: Oran". Colonies françaises. Géographie pittoresque et monumentale de la France (in French). Paris: Flammarion. hdl:2027/mdp.39015005579753. (+ table of contents)
- Jean Cazenave (1926). "Oran cité berbère". Bulletin de la Société de Géographie et d'Archéologie d'Oran (in French). 46.
- René Lespès (1938). Oran: Etude de geographie et d'histoire urbaines (in French). Paris: Alcan.
- Camille Kehl (1942). Oran et l'Oranie avant l'occupation Française (in French). L. Fouque.
- Robert Tinthoin (1956). "Oran, ville moderne". L'Information géographique (in French). 20. ISSN 1777-5876 – via Persee.fr.
- Andrée Dagorne (1995). "Oran, Métropole de l'Ouest algérien, d'hier à aujourd'hui". Cahiers de la Méditerranée (in French). 51. ISSN 1773-0201 – via Persee.fr.
- Bendjelid, Abed; Hadeid, Mohamed; Messahel, Abdellah; Trache, Sidi Mohammed (2004). "Oran une ville d'Algérie". Insaniyat (in French) (23–24): 7–44. doi:10.4000/insaniyat.5340. ISSN 2253-0738.
  - Bibliography
- Dalila Senhadji Khiat (2010). "Les mosquées en Algérie ou l'espace reconquis: l'exemple d'Oran". L'Année du Maghreb (in French). 6: 291–303. doi:10.4000/anneemaghreb.907. ISSN 2109-9405 – via Revues.org.
