= Jacques Chevallier =

Jacques Chevallier may refer to:

- Jacques Chevallier (politician) (1911–1971), French-Algerian industrialist and politician
- Jacques Le Chevallier, French glassmaker and decorative artist
- Jacques Chevallier (engineer) (1921–2009), French naval engineer and defence civil servant

== See also ==
- Jacques Chevalier (1882–1962), French Catholic philosopher and politician
