= Timeline of Algiers =

The following is a timeline of the history of the city of Algiers, Algeria.

== Prior to 16th century ==
- 3rd century BC – Yksm (Icosium) settled by Punics.
- 146 BC – Icosium became part of the Roman Empire.
- 371 AD – City raided by Firmus.
- 5th century AD – Vandals in power.
- 7th century AD – Arabs in power.
- 960 – Algiers founded by Buluggin ibn Ziri.
- 1014 – Hammadid dynasty in power.
- 1018 – Djamaa el Kebir mosque built.
- 1159 – Almohad Caliphate in power.
- 1313 – Ziyanids of the Kingdom of Tlemcen in power.

== 16th–18th centuries ==
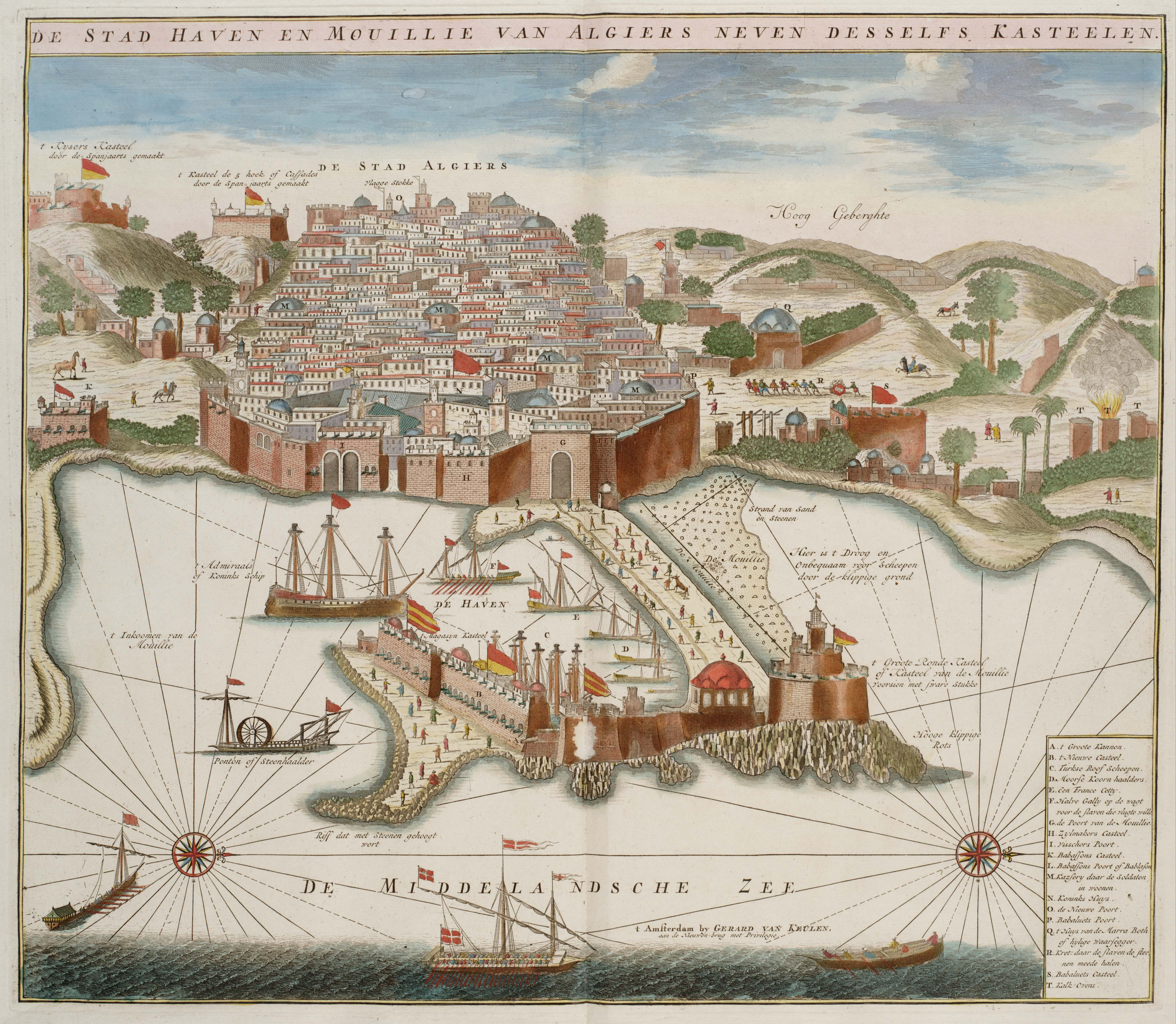
Algiers, ca.1690

- 1516
  - Capture of Algiers by Hayreddin Barbarossa and Aruj Barbarossa.
  - Kasbah construction begins.
- 1518 – Harbour construction begins.
- 1529 – Capture of Peñón of Algiers by Hayreddin Barbarossa.
- 1544 – Lighthouse built.
- 1545 – Fort de l'Empereur built.
- 1549 – Muslim hospital founded.
- 1556 – Citadel built.
- 1581 – Fort Bab Azoun built.
- 1612
  - Ketchaoua Mosque built.
  - Hospital of the Holy Trinity founded.
- 1622 – Aqueducts and Jama Bitchnin (mosque) built.
- 1660 – Mosque of the Fishery built.
- 1661 – Tamentfoust Castle built.
- 1696 – Mosque of Sidi Abderrahman built.
- 1769 – Dano–Algerian War begins.
- 1775 – 8 July: Attempted invasion of Algiers by Spanish forces.
- 1783 – 4–8 August: Bombardment of Algiers by Spanish forces.
- 1784 – 12 July: Bombardment of Algiers by Spanish-Neapolitan-Maltese-Portuguese forces.
- 1791 – Ketshawa Mosque built.
- 1799 – Palais d'Hiver du Gouverneur built.

== 19th century ==
- 1805 – 29 June: After the assassination of the head of the influential family, Busnach, the Janissaries sacked Algiers killing between 200 and 500 Jews. Causing serious unrest throughout the city.
- 1816 – 27 August: Bombardment of Algiers by Anglo-Dutch forces.
- 1817 – Kesba Berranee mosque built.
- 1824 – Bombardment of Algiers by British forces.
- 1825 – Fort des Anglais built.
- 1830 – June–July: Invasion of Algiers by French forces; the city becomes capital of French Algeria.
- 1832 – Jardin d'essai laid out.
- 1835 – National Library of Algeria founded.
- 1836 – Northern harbour construction begins.
- 1847 – Jardin Marengo laid out.
- 1866 – Boulevard de la Republique constructed.
- 1870 – Holy Trinity church built.
- 1872 – Notre-Dame d'Afrique church built.
- 1878 – Church of St. Augustin built.
- 1888 – Population: 56,000.
- 1890 – Algiers Observatory built in Bouzaréah.
- 1897 – National Museum of Antiquities and Islamic Art relocates to Mustapha Superieur.
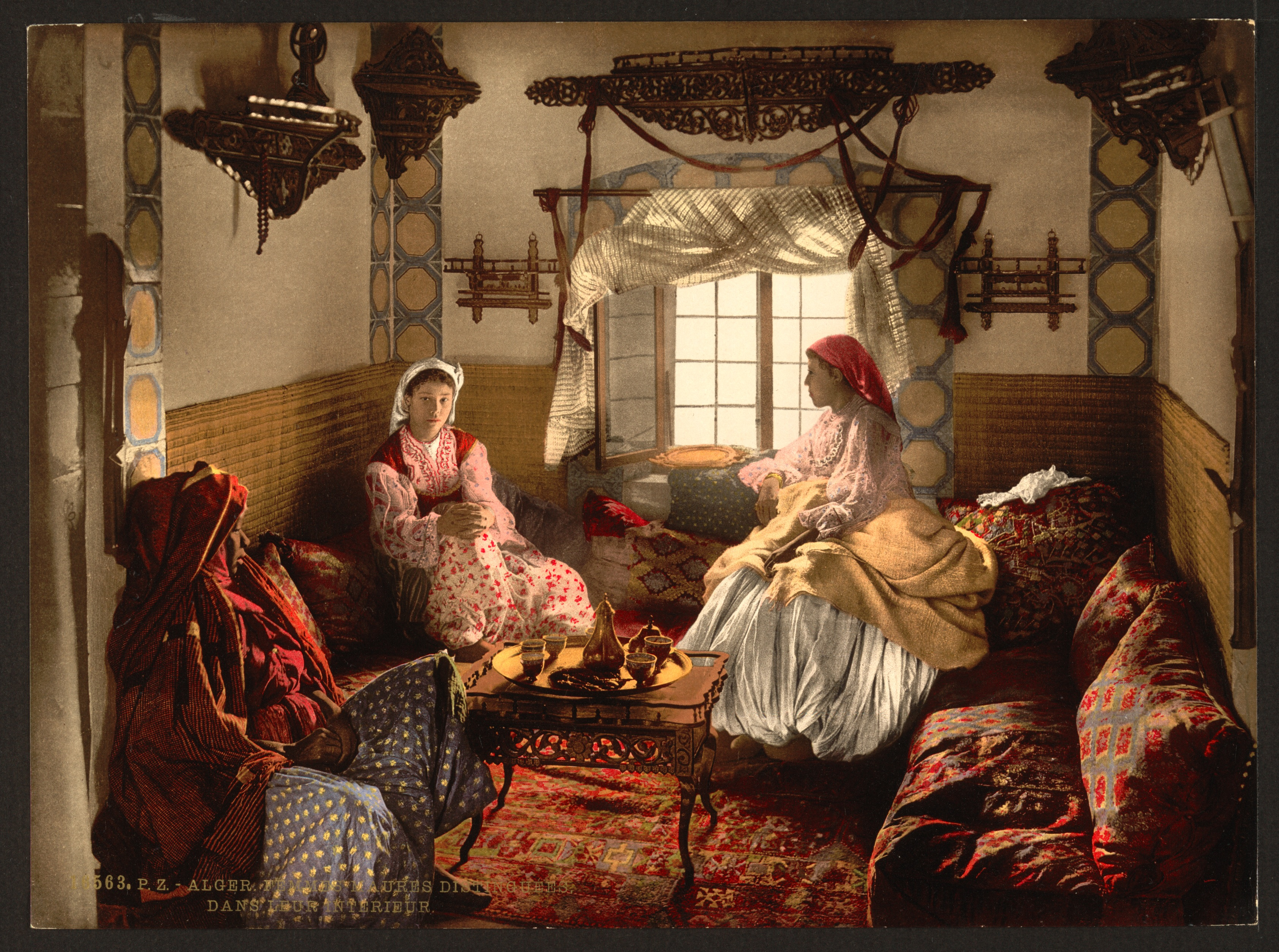
Distinguished Moorish women, Algiers, 1899

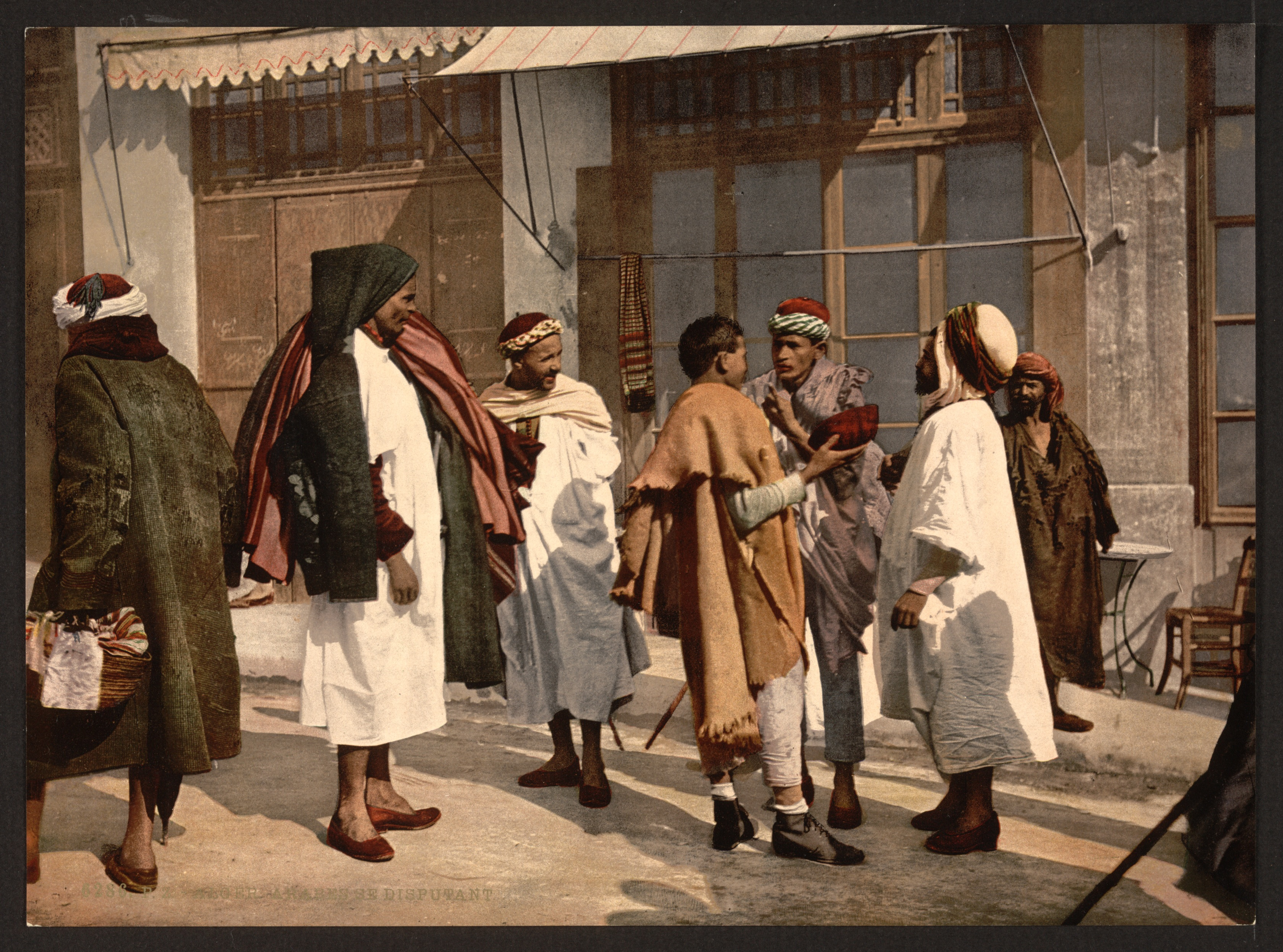
Arabs disputing, Algiers, 1899

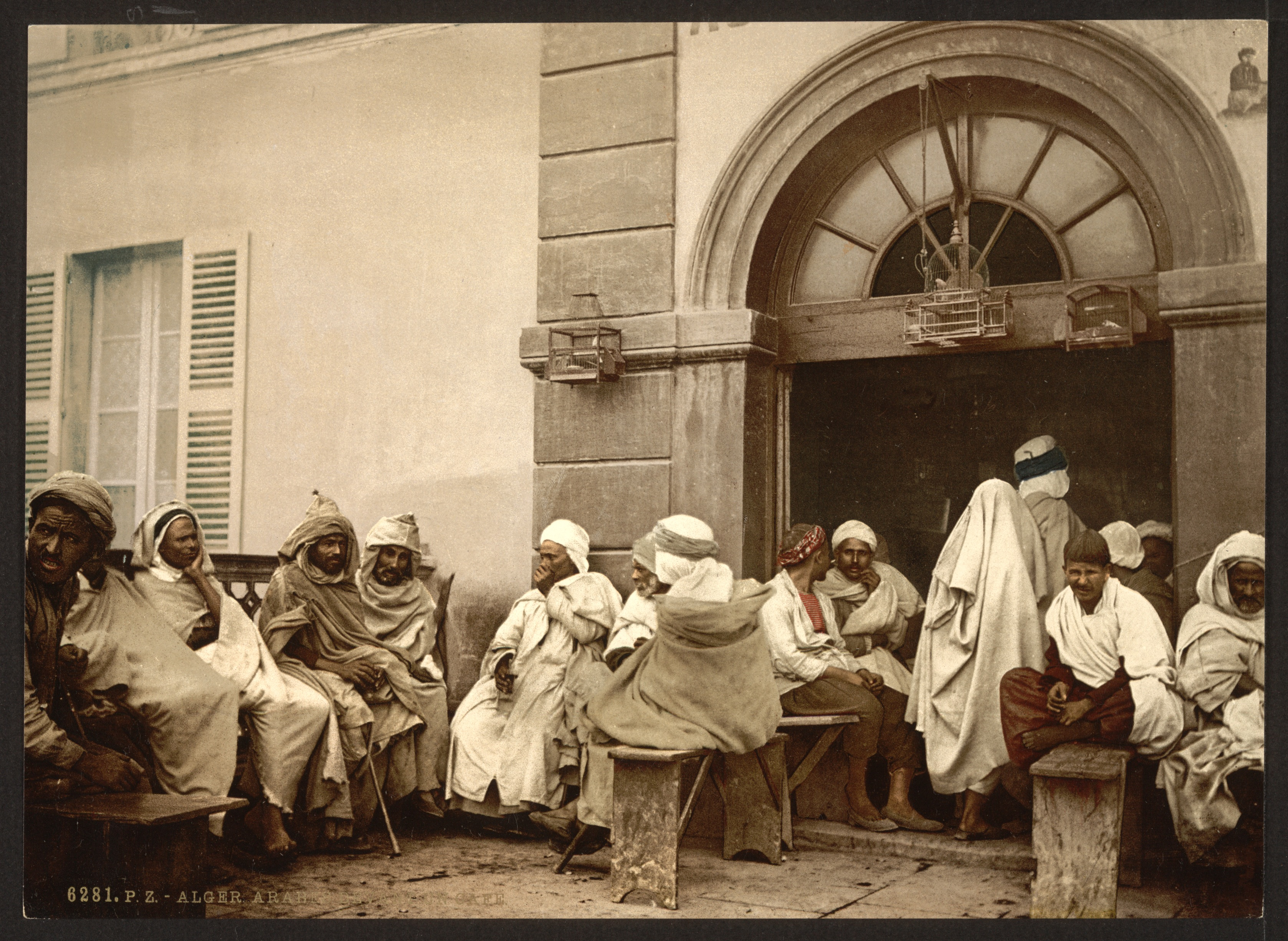
Arabs at a cafe, Algiers, 1899

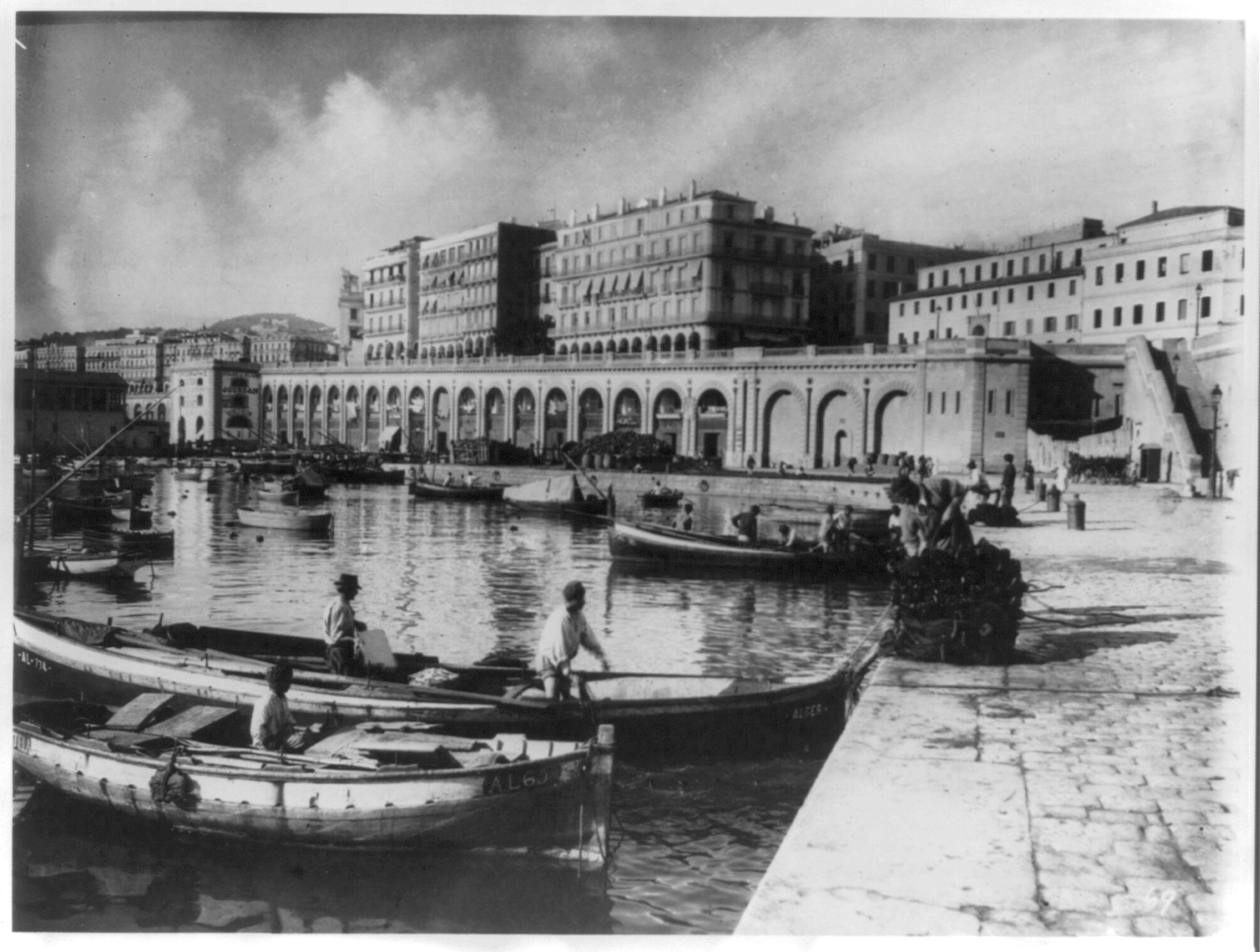
Algiers – the embankment and Boulevard de la Republique 1894

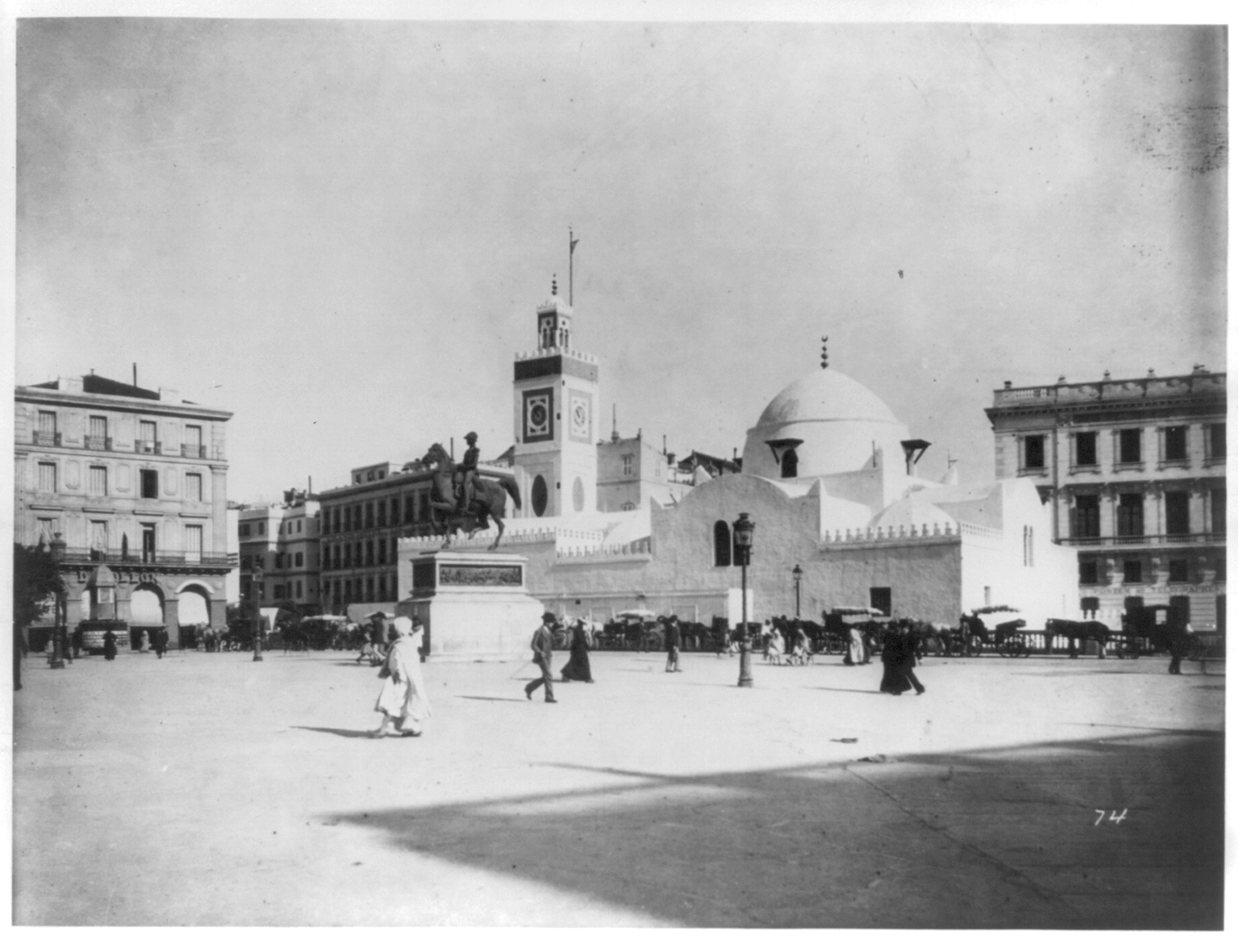
Algiers – the new Mosque Djamaa, El-Djedid 1894

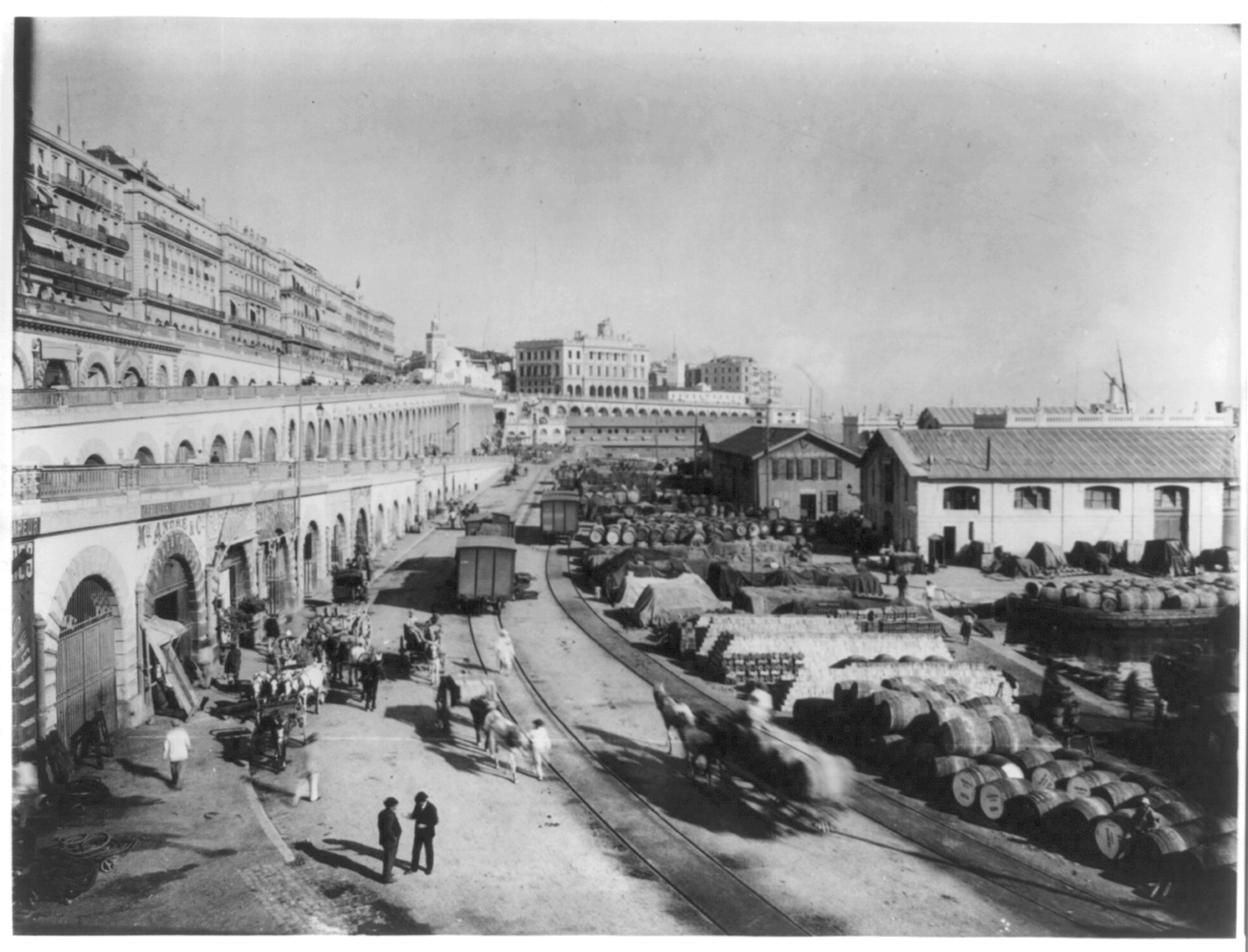
Algiers – depot and station grounds of Algerian Railway 1894

== 20th century ==
- 1904
  - Medersa opens.
  - Southern harbour construction begins.
- 1906 – Population: 138,240.
- 1908
  - May: National Museum of Fine Arts of Algiers established.
  - Quai de la Marine extended.
  - Cinema opens.
- 1909 – Algiers 1 University founded.
- 1910 – Grand Post Office built.
- 1912 – Population: 172,397.
- 1921 – Mouloudia Chaàbia d'Alger football club formed.
- 1924 – Maison Blanche Airport begins operating.
- 1928 – Bardo National Museum of Prehistory and Ethnography established.
- 1930 – Population: 246,061.
- 1933 – Palais du Gouvernement built.
- 1935 – Stade communal de Saint Eugène (sport stadium) built.
- 1942
  - May: Camus' novel L’Étranger published.
  - November: Conflict between Axis and Allied forces.
- 1948 – Population: 266,165 city; 488,893 urban agglomeration.

=== 1950s–1980s ===
- 1950 – Population: 516,000 (urban agglomeration).
- 1952 – Aerohabitat housing complex built.
- 1953 – Jacques Chevallier becomes mayor.
- 1954
  - Anti-French unrest.
  - Diar el Mahçoul housing development and 200 Colonnes housing complex built.
- 1956
  - 30 September: Battle of Algiers begins.
  - National Liberation Front headquartered in city.
- 1958 – May: Pro-French unrest.
- 1959 – Siemens branch in business.
- 1960
  - January: Pro-French unrest.
  - Population: 872,000 (urban agglomeration).
- 1961 – April: Coup attempt.
- 1962
  - City becomes capital of independent Algeria.
  - 200,000 European residents depart.
- 1963
  - Centre National d'Etudes et d'Analyses pour la Population et le Développement headquartered in city.
  - Algerian National Theatre established.
- 1966
  - Pontecorvo's film The Battle of Algiers released.
  - Population: 903,530 city; 943,142 urban agglomeration; 1,648,038 metro.
- 1969 – Pan-African Arts Festival held.
- 1972 – 5 July 1962 Stadium opens.
- 1973 – September: International summit of the Non-Aligned Movement held in city.
- 1975 – Hotel El-Aurassi in business.
- 1977 – Population: 1,523,000 city; 1,740,461 urban agglomeration.
- 1978 – July: All-Africa Games held.
- 1982 – Martyrs Memorial erected.
- 1985 – National Institute for Global Strategic Studies headquartered in city.
- 1988 – October: Anti-government demonstrations.

=== 1990s ===
- 1990
  - March: African Cup of Nations held.
  - Population: 1,819,000 (urban agglomeration).
- 1991 – Political unrest.
- 1992
  - August: Algiers airport bombing.
  - Casbah of Algiers designated an UNESCO World Heritage Site.
- 1994
  - 24 December: Air France Flight 8969 hijacked at Algiers Airport.
  - National Library of Algeria building inaugurated.
- 1997 – Algiers Stock Exchange established.
- 1998 – Population: 2,988,145.
- 2000
  - L'Expression newspaper begins publication.
  - Population: 2,278,000 (urban agglomeration).

== 21st century ==
- 2001
  - Flood.
  - Algeria Cinema opens.
- 2003 – 21 May: The 6.8 M_{w} Boumerdès earthquake affected northern Algeria with a maximum Mercalli intensity of X (Extreme). With at least 400 killed in Algiers alone, more than 2,200 people were killed altogether, and a moderate tsunami sank boats located near Spain's Balearic Islands.
- 2004 – September–October: 2004 Pan Arab Games held.
- 2007
  - Museum of Modern Art of Algiers inaugurated.
  - April: Bombings.
  - July: All-Africa Games held.
  - 11 December: Bombings.
- 2008
  - Centre Commercial Al Qods shopping mall opens.
  - Population: 2,712,944.
- 2009 – Centre Commercial Bab Ezzouar built.
- 2010 – Protests.
- 2011
  - Protests.
  - Algiers Metro and Algiers tramway begin operating.
  - Population: 2,916,000 (urban agglomeration).
- 2018 – African Youth Games to be held in Algiers.

== See also ==
- Algiers history
- List of Pashas and Deys of Algiers (Regency of Algiers)
- List of mayors of Algiers, 1830–present (includes French period)
- History of Algeria
- Years in Algeria
- Timeline of Algeria
- Timelines of other cities in Algeria: Oran

== Bibliography ==
=== in English ===
Published in 18th–19th centuries

- J. Morgan (1728), "The Antiquity, Names, Revolutions and Situation of the City of Algiers", A Complete History of Algiers, London: Printed for the author, by J. Bettenham, OCLC 3343218
- James Wilson Stevens (1797), An Historical and Geographical Account of Algiers, Philadelphia: Printed by Hogan & M'Elroy, OL 7239367M
- Abraham Rees (1819), "Algiers", The Cycloppædia, London: Longman, Hurst, Rees, Orme & Brown
- William Shaler (1826), "City of Algiers", Sketches of Algiers, Political, Historical, and Civil, Boston: Cummings, Hilliard and Company
- David Brewster, ed. (1830). "Algiers". Edinburgh Encyclopædia. Edinburgh: William Blackwood. hdl:2027/mdp.39015082314801 – via HathiTrust.
- Josiah Conder (1830), "City of Algiers", The Modern Traveller, London: J.Duncan
- Josiah Conder (1830), "(Algiers)", Africa, Dictionary of Geography, Ancient and Modern, London: T. Tegg
- Edward William Lewis Davies (1858), Algiers in 1857, Longman, Brown, Green, Longmans, & Roberts, OL 20463583M
- Samuel Sullivan Cox (1870), Search for Winter Sunbeams in the Riviera, Corsica, Algiers and Spain, New York: D. Appleton & Company, OCLC 1022285, OL 6944535M
- Lisbeth Gooch Seguin (1878), Walks in Algiers and its Surroundings, London: Daldy, Isbister & Co., OL 23405512M
- "Algiers", Appleton's European Guide Book, New York: D. Appleton & Co., 1888
- Noah Brooks (1895), "Algiers", The Mediterranean Trip, C. Scribner's Sons, OCLC 1315401
- R. Lambert Playfair (1895), "City of Algiers", Handbook for Travellers in Algeria and Tunis (5th ed.), London: J. Murray, OCLC 4443952
- Leo Africanus; John Pory (1896), "Alger", in Robert Brown (ed.), History and Description of Africa, vol. 2, London: Hakluyt Society, OCLC 2649691

Published in 20th century

- "Algiers", Chambers's Encyclopaedia, London: W. & R. Chambers, 1901
- T. G. Bonney; et al. (1904), "Algiers", The Mediterranean, its Storied Cities and Venerable Ruins, New York: J. Pott
- Cook's Practical Guide to Algiers, Algeria and Tunisia, London: T. Cook & Son, 1904
- "Algiers" . Encyclopædia Britannica. Vol. 1 (11th ed.). 1910. pp. 653–655.
- "Algiers", The Mediterranean, Leipzig: Karl Baedeker, 1911, OCLC 490068
- "Alger". Encyclopaedia of Islam. E.J. Brill. 1913. p. 256+. ISBN 90-04-08265-4.
- D.E. Lorenz (1922), "Algiers", The New Mediterranean Traveller: A Handbook of Practical Information (7th ed.), F.H. Revell Company
- Gert Eichler (1977). "From Colonialism to National Independence: Algiers' Social Ecology". GeoJournal. 1 (5): 5–12. Bibcode:1977GeoJo...1....5E. doi:10.1007/BF00188881. JSTOR 41142033. S2CID 143917804.
- Ellen G. Friedman (1980). "Trinitarian Hospitals in Algiers: An Early Example of Health Care for Prisoners of War". Catholic Historical Review. 66 (4): 551–564. JSTOR 25020912. PMID 11631798.
- Zeynep Çelik (scholar) (1997). Urban Forms and Colonial Confrontations: Algiers Under French Rule. Berkeley: University of California Press – via UC Press E-Books Collection.

Published in 21st century

- Paul Tiyambe Zeleza; Dickson Eyoh, eds. (2003). "Algiers, Algeria". Encyclopedia of Twentieth-Century African History. Routledge. ISBN 0-415-23479-4.
- Allen Christelow (2004). "Algiers". In Kevin Shillington (ed.). Encyclopedia of African History. Routledge. pp. 66–67. ISBN 978-1-135-45670-2.
- Karim Hadjri, Mohamed Osmani (2004). "Spatial development and urban transformation of colonial and postcolonial Algiers". In Yasser Elsheshtawy (ed.). Planning Middle Eastern Cities: An Urban Kaleidoscope. Routledge. p. 29. ISBN 978-1-134-41010-1.
- Jean-Louis Cohen (2006). "Architectural History and the Colonial Question: Casablanca, Algiers and Beyond". Architectural History. 49. ISSN 0066-622X.
- C. Edmund Bosworth, ed. (2007). "Algiers". Historic Cities of the Islamic World. Leiden: Koninklijke Brill. p. 22. ISBN 978-9004153882.
- Kenneth Brown (2008), "Algiers", in Bruce E. Stanley; Michael R.T. Dumper (eds.), Cities of the Middle East and North Africa, Santa Barbara, USA: ABC-CLIO, p. 29, ISBN 978-1-57607-920-1
- Shiela Crane (2008). "Architecture at the ends of empire: urban reflections between Algiers and Marseille". In Gyan Prakash and Kevin Michael Kruse (ed.). Spaces of the Modern City: Imaginaries, Politics, and Everyday Life. Princeton University Press. p. 99. ISBN 978-0-691-13343-0.
- Attilio Petruccioli (2008). "Algiers: the Colonial City". In Salma K. Jayyusi; et al. (eds.). The City in the Islamic World. Koninklijke Brill. p. 993+. ISBN 978-90-04-16240-2.
- Gabor Agoston; Bruce Alan Masters (2009). "Algiers". Encyclopedia of the Ottoman Empire. Facts on File. p. 33. ISBN 978-1-4381-1025-7.
- "Algiers". Grove Encyclopedia of Islamic Art & Architecture. Oxford University Press. 2009. p. 52. ISBN 978-0-19-530991-1.

=== in French ===
- Ch. Brossard, ed. (1906). "Algerie: Description des villes: Algers". Colonies françaises. Géographie pittoresque et monumentale de la France (in French). Paris: Flammarion. hdl:2027/mdp.39015005579753. (+ table of contents)
- Rachid Sidi Boumedine (2002). "Alger, la complexité d'une métropole". Cahiers de la Méditerranée (in French). 64 – via Revues.org.
- Nora Semmoud (2003). "Les mutations de la morphologie socio-spatiale algéroise" [Transformation of Algiers urban morphology]. Annales de géographie (in French). 112 – via Persee.fr.
