= Santa Cruz Sanctuary =

Sanctuary in Oran, Algeria

- Sanctuaire de Santa Cruz
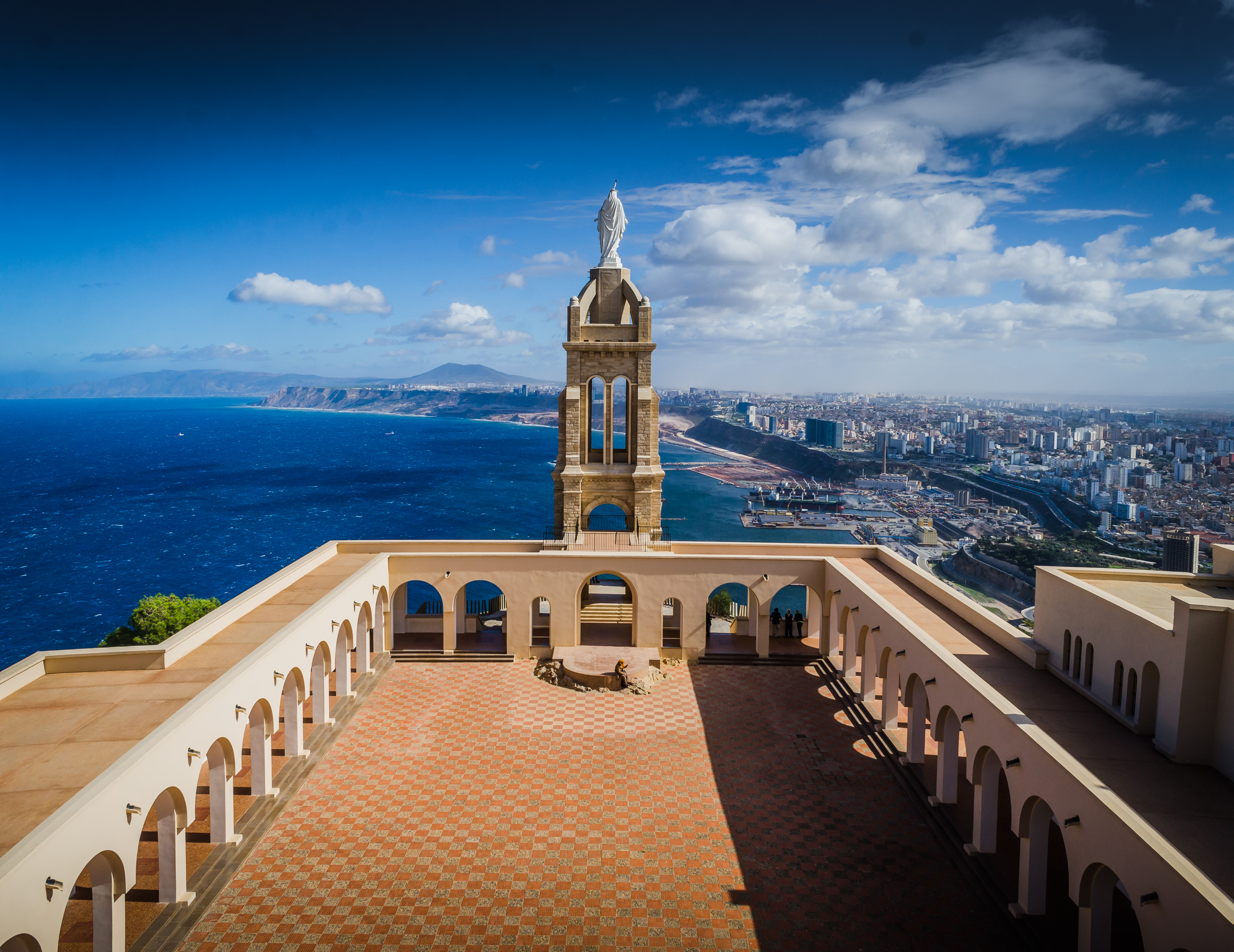

Religion
- Affiliation: Catholicism
- Patron: Our Lady of Santa Cruz

Location
- Location: Oran, Algeria
- Interactive map of Santa Cruz Sanctuary
- Coordinates: 35.7098°N 0.66335°W

The Santa Cruz Sanctuary (French: Sanctuaire de Santa Cruz) is a chapel in Oran, constructed on the Aïdour mountain below the Fort of Santa Cruz, named in honor of Our Lady of Salvation and renamed Our Lady of Santa Cruz. It falls under the diocese of Oran. Since 1950, the sanctuary has been gradually expanded with a basilica, a cloister, and a belvedere overlooking the city and the Mediterranean Sea.

== History ==
In 1849, a cholera epidemic broke out and struck the entire city of Oran, claiming 1,172 victims. General Pelissier, commander of the French forces, suggested to the Vicar General of Algiers, Father Suchet, that a statue of the Virgin Mary be placed atop the mountain where the Santa Cruz fort was located. On November 4th, during a procession, thousands of faithful implored the Virgin to save them from the plague that had befallen the city. Then, the rain began to fall in abundance. After a few days, the epidemic became less virulent and eventually ceased.

On December 8, 2018, the beatification ceremony for the nineteen religious figures assassinated between 1994 and 1996 during the Algerian Civil War took place there.
