= Aïdour =

Mountain in Oran, Algeria

- Murdjajo
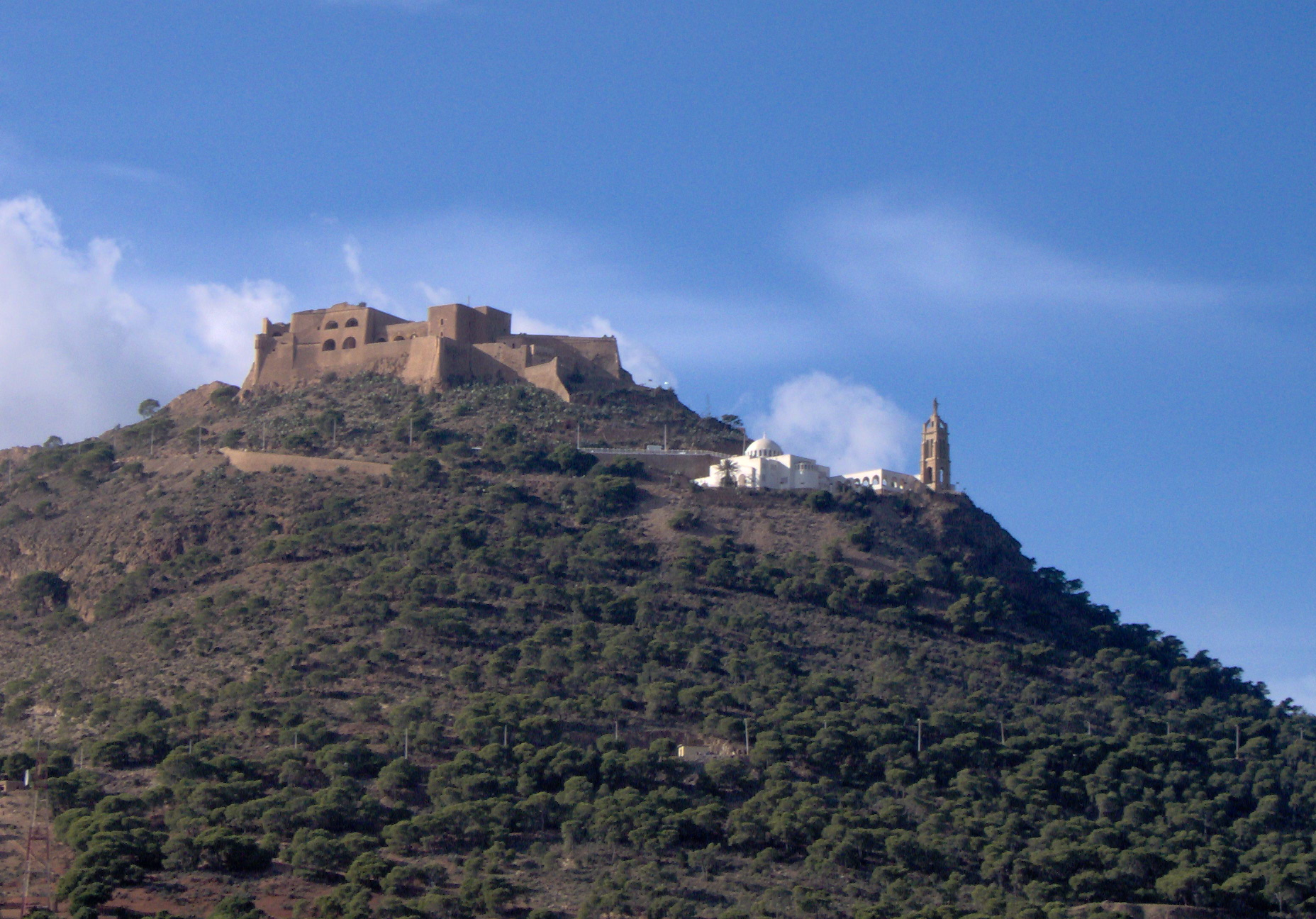

Highest point
- Elevation: 429.3 m (1,408 ft)
- Coordinates: 35°42′07″N 0°40′58″W

Geography
- Location: Oran Province, Algeria

The Aïdour, or Murdjajo, is a mountain reaching an altitude of 429.3 m, overlooking the city of Oran. Several buildings were constructed there, including the fort and the chapel of Santa Cruz.

== Geography ==
=== Geology ===
The Aïdour and its surroundings are made up of a marl-diatomitic layer covered by a carbonaceous complex.

=== Flora and Fauna ===
The northwest slope of the massif is covered by the cork oak forest of M'Sila. The areas of scattered vineyards in 1962 were reforested with Aleppo pines, except for one located halfway up the southeast slope of the mountain. Reforestation then expanded until it covered almost the entire summit of the mountain and a large part of its southwest slope.

== History ==
=== French period ===
In 1835, the military engineering corps undertook the construction of the coastal road to link Oran to Mers El Kébir. This work involved the construction of a tunnel.

The old chapel at the foot of the cloister was demolished in 1951 at the start of construction work on the cloister, which was completed in 1956.

== See also ==
- Oran
- Quarters of Oran
- Oran Province
