= List of mayors of Algiers =

The following is a list of mayors and equivalent officials of the city of Algiers, Algeria.

== Mayors ==
- Ahmed Bouderba, 1830–1831
- Charles Branthome, 1831–1841
- Clément, circa 1841
- Huber, 1841–1842
- François de Lévézou, 1842–1848
- Lechêne, 1848–1853
- Jean-Baptiste Vincent de Guiroye, 1853–1858
- Jean-Jules Sarlande, circa 1858–1867
- Jean François Joseph Gastu, 1871–1873
- Romuald Vuillermoz, 1873–1874
- Adolphe Blasselle, 1874
- Mongellas, 1876–1878
- Jean-Jude Feuillet, 1878–1881
- Guillemin, 1881–1898
- Max Régis, 1898–1899
- Voinot, 1899–1901
- Jean Antonini, 1901–1902
- Altairac, 1902–1908
- Savignon, 1908–1910
- Charles De Galland, 1910–1919
- Alphonse Raffi, 1924–1929
- Brunel, 1929–1936
- Augustin Rozis, 1936–1942
- Peisson, 1942–1943
- Marcel Duclos, 1943–1944
- Murat, 1944–1945
- Paul Tubert, 1945–1947
- Pierre-René Gazagne, 1947–1953
- Jacques Chevallier, 1953–1958
- Omar Mohamed Bouarouba, 1958–1960
- Charles Corbin, 1960–1961
- Joseph Lounes Hattab-Pacha, 1961–1962

== Presidents of Conseil Populaire de la Ville d'Alger ==
- Bachir Mentouri, 1967–1975
- Mustapha Medjaoui, circa 1977
- Khelifa Belaid, 1980–1985
- Smaïl Tifaoui, circa 1995

== See also ==
- Algiers#Government (fr)
- Timeline of Algiers
