= Corinne Chevallier =

Algerian historian and novelist (born 1935)

- Born: 25 June 1935 (age 91); Algiers, French Algeria
- Citizenship: Algerian
- Occupations: Historian, novelist
- Parent: Jacques Chevallier
- Writing career
- Language: French
- Notable works: La Petite Fille du Tassili, La Nuit du corsaire

Corinne Chevallier (born 25 June 1935) is an Algerian historian and novelist of pied noir descent. Her father, Jacques Chevallier, was mayor of Algiers.

== Life ==
She was born in Algiers in 1935, where she has lived ever since.

She is one of the few pieds noirs who took Algerian citizenship and remained in the new state.

== Works ==
Her works include the novels La Petite Fille du Tassili (Algiers: Éditions Casbah, 2001) and La Nuit du corsaire (Algiers: Éditions Casbah, 2005)
