= List of mayors of Oran =

The following is a list of mayors and equivalent officials of the city of Oran, Algeria.

== Royal commissioners, 1832–48 ==
- Pujol, 1832
- Pierre François Xavier Boyer, circa 1832
- Pascal de Lesseps, circa 1834
- Marius Jonquier, circa 1848

== Mayors, 1849–1962 ==
- Jean-Félix Renaud-Lebon, 1849
- David, 1850
- André Freixe, 1852
- Cauquil, 1855
- Armand Marion, 1861
- Maurice Carité, 1862
- Joseph Decugis, 1866
- Choupot, 1867
- Théodore Garbé, 1867
- Renault, 1868
- Joseph Andrieu, 1870
- Marie Prosper Eugène Gradwohl
- Achille Bariat, 1872
- Alexandre Cauquil, 1877
- Floréal Mathieu, 1878
- Louis Rey, 1882–1883
- Pierre Ayme, 1884
- Floréal Mathieu, 1886
- Floréal Mathieu, 1892
- Laurent Fouques, 1896
- Pierre Couture, 1901
- Arthur Gobert, 1902
- Hippolyte Giraud, 1905–1907
- Eugène Colombani, 1907
- Colombani, 1912
- Jules Gasser, 1912
- Antoine Béranger, 1921
- Jules Molle, 1921–1931
- Paul Ménudier, 1931–1934
- Gabriel Lambert, 1934–1941
- Gaëtan Lévêque, 1941–1942
- Jules Gasser, 1943–1945
- Casimir, 1945–1947
- Nicolas Zannettacci, 1947–1948
- Jules Abadie, 1948
- Henri Fouques-Duparc, 1948–1962

== President of city delegation, 1962–67 ==
- Abdessamad Benabdellah, 1962–1963
- Boudraâ Bel Abbès, 1963–1965
- Hadj Brahim Tayeb Mokhtar Al Mahaji, 1965
- Seghier Ben Ali, 1965–1967

== President of People's Municipal Assembly, 1967–92 ==
- Seghier Ben Ali, 1967–1975
- Briki Abdelkader, 1975–1979
- Seghier Djillali, 1979–1980
- Benamar Lahouari, 1980–1983
- Benkoula Tayeb, 1983–1984
- Arif Kaddour, 1984–1988
- Tounsi Abdelkader, 1988–1990
- Bouslah Boualem, 1990–1992

== President of the Délégation exécutive communale, 1992–97 ==
- Henni Merouane, 1992–1995
- Habib Benguenane, 1995–1997

== President of People's Municipal Assembly, since 1997 ==
- Zitouni Tayeb, 1997–2002
- Djellouli Noureddine, 2002–2003
- Boukhatem Noureddine, 2004–2007
- Saddek Benkada, 2007–2010
- Hassam Zinedine, 2010–2012
- Boukhatem Noureddine, 2012–2017

== See also ==
- List of governors of Oran, 902–1831 (Islam Caliphate, Spanish and Ottoman periods)
- Timeline of Oran
