= Jules Abadie =

French politician and surgeon (1876–1953)

- Born: August 12, 1876; Blaye, Gironde
- Died: August 10, 1953 (aged 76)
- Occupations: French politician and surgeon

Jules Abadie (12 August 1876 – 10 August 1953) was a French politician and surgeon in Oran, French Algeria, acting as a member of the Comité Français de Libération Nationale (CFLN).

== Biography ==
Jean Baptiste Marie Jules Abadie was born 12 August 1876 in Blaye, Gironde.

Exempted from military service in 1896 for tuberculosis, Abadie volunteered as a medic during both World Wars, after which he was promoted to Colonel of the Reserves for his service.

In 1901, Abadie started his career as a surgeon in Montpellier. In 1904, following the completion of a series of entrance exams, he moved to the Hospital of Oran, where he would become the chief surgeon. Abadie also ran a medical clinic in Maramar, where he worked with his wife who was also a doctor. His work as a researcher, particularly in the field of Gastric Surgery and Emergency war surgery, gained him fame in France and abroad. As such, he was elected to the French National Academy of Surgeons, correspondent of the National Academy of Doctors, and a representative of North Africa to the International Society of Surgery.

Between 1907 and 1910 Abadie was a delegate from Oran to the Financial Delegation in Algeria.

Due to his close relationship with Henri Giraud, on 23 March 1943, Abadie was made the Secretary of the Interior of the French Civil and Military High Command. After the Comité Français de Libération Nationale (CFLN) was formed in June 1943 by co-presidents, Henri Giraud and Charles de Gaulle, Abadie served as Commissioner of Justice in the CFLN from June to September 1943 and as Commissioner of Education and Health from June to November. As part of his duties, Abadie worked towards the reinstatement of the Crémieux decree.

Being a proponent of Henri Giraud, Abadie lost his functions after Giraud resigned the CFLN co-presidency in November 1943.

When Giraud lost control of the CFLN, Abadie was sent on a mission to North America to study how public health initiatives on hygiene were functioning.

For 2 months in 1948, Abadie was mayor of Oran. He died on 10 August 1953.

== Private life ==
His spouse, Hélène Feyguine, was born on 21 May 1888 in Samara, Russia to Geresime Feyguine and Mrs. née Politoff. She became a doctor of medicine in 1905. Together they would have 2 daughters, Helene and Nicole and one son, Jean.

== Distinctions ==
- National Order of the Legion of Honour
  - Knight (31/12/1916)
  - Officer (11/2/1928)
  - Commander (29/9/1950)
- 1914-1918 war cross with palm
- Commander of the Alaouite Ouissam
- Public Health Commander

== Works ==
- Des luxations radiacarpiennes traumatiques (1901)
- Contribution à l'étude des questions d'assistance sociale en Algérie (1909)
- Appendicite post-traumatique (1910)
- Occlusion duodénale aiguë post-opératoire (1910)
- Ostéosarcome du tibia (1910)
- Etude pour une automobile chirurgicale pour opérations au voisinage du front (La Presse Médicale N ° 5 of February 4, 1915, Transcription by lLaurent Provost)
- Les Blessures de l'abdomen (1916)
- Impressions de voyage en Amérique du Sud (1939)
- En mission aux États-Unis et Canada (1944)
- Discours d'ouverture du 53^{e} Congrès français de chirurgie (October 2, 1950)

== Bibliography ==
- Alfred Salinas, Quand Franco réclamait Oran : l'Opération Cisneros, The Harmattan, 2008
- Alfred Salinas, Les Américains en Algérie 1942-1945, The Harmattan, 2013
- Alfred Salinas, Jules Abadie : itinéraire d'un médecin devenu ministre et maire d'Oran, The Harmattan, 2015
- Revue d'hygiène et de police sanitaire, 1915, n° 37, BIU Santé - Search in Medic @ periodicals

== Bibliography ==
- Alfred Salinas, Jules Abadie, Itinéraire d'un médecin devenu ministre et maire d'Oran, L'Harmattan, Paris, 2015

Political offices
Preceded by René Cassin	Commissioner of Justice; 1943	Succeeded by François de Menthon
Preceded by René Cassin	Commissioner of Education; 1943	Succeeded by René Capitant
Preceded by	Commissioner of Health; 1943	Succeeded by François Billoux
