= Quarters of Oran =

Overview of quarters in Oran, Algeria

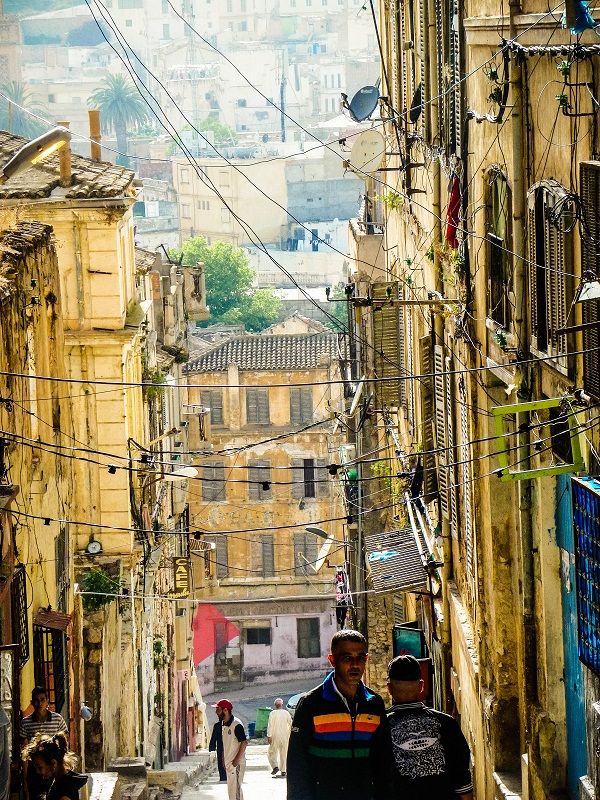
Street in El Houari, Oran, 2015

Map of Oran in 1942, showing names of quarters

The city of Oran in Algeria is divided into eighteen administrative "secteurs urbains" (urban areas). In 1994 twelve areas were established, each with its own administration, overseen by an elected municipal delegate who manages administrative, technical, political and social affairs.^{(fr)} Population growth led to the creation in 2017 of six additional urban areas: Akid Lotfi, Ed-Derb, Fellaoucène, Hammou Boutlélis, El-Khaldia, and Mahieddine.

== List of current areas ==
Les 18 communal délégations et les 83 quarters of Oran.
Communal délégations				Population 2019 (source APC d'Oran)	Quarters	
Class.	Name	Arab name	Former name	Population 2019 (source APC d'Oran)	Name	Former name
1st c. d.	El Menzeh	المنزه	Canastel	55,700	01 : Boufala Lakhdar; 02 : 20 Août 1955; 03 : El Abassi Azzouz; 04 : Safir Kaddour; 05 : Bendaoud Laaredj; 06 : Hamdaoui Djelloul	01 : 02 : 03 : 04 : 05 : 06 : Pépinière
2nd c. d.	Colonel Lotfi	العقيد لطفي		...	01 : Aghir Mohamed; 02 : Ramdane Djamel; 03 : Dahmane Boutkhil; 04 : Boukerche Lahouari; 05 : Colonel Lotfi; 06 : Belabyoud Adda; 07 : Nouri Mohamed	01 : 02 : 03 : 04 : 05 : 06 : 07 :
3rd c. d.	Es Seddikia	الصديقية	Gambetta	55,000	01 : Es Seddikia; 02 : Ibn Rochd; 03 : Bon Acceuil; 04 : Frères Missoum; 05 : Point du Jour	01 : Gambetta; 02 : HLM Gambetta; 03 : Bon Acceuil; 04 : HLM Gambetta; 05 :
4th c. d.	Hamou Boutlelis	حمو بوتليليس	Es Seddikia	...	01 : El Mactaa; 02 : El Kettar	01 : Carteaux; 02 : Bon Acceuil
5th c. d.	Fellaoucen	فلاوسن	Barki	...	01 : Fellaoucen; 02 : Djamel Eddine	01 : Sanchidrian; 02 :
6th c. d.	El Makkari	المقري	Saint-Eugène	78,000	01 : El Makkari; 02 : Tafna; 03 : Martyrs; 04 : Les Oliviers; 05 : Dar El Beida	01 : Saint-Eugène; 02 : Hippodrome; 03 : Les Castors; 04 : Les Oliviers; 05 :
7th c. d.	El Emir	الأمير	Centre Ville	167,000	01 : El Emir; 02 : Yaghmoracen; 03 : El Moudjahiddine; 04 : El Omaria; 05 : Bensnouci Mokhtar	01 : Hôtel de Ville; 02 : Saint-Pierre; 03 : Miramar; 04 : Montplaisant; 05 : Bel Air
8th c. d.	Ennasr	النصر	Derb	...	01 : Ennasr; 02 : Sidi Okba; 03 : El Karama	01 : Derb; 02 : Saint-Antoine; 03 : Karguentah
9th c. d.	El Khalidia	الخالدية	Delmonte	...	01 : El Khalidia; 02 : El Manouar	01 : Delmonte, Cavaignac; 02 : Saint-Charles
10th c. d.	Ibn Sina	ابن سينا	Victor Hugo	55,000	01 : Ibn Sina; 02 : Daya	01 : Victor Hugo, Bastie; 02 : Petit Lac
11th c. d.	El Hamri	الحمري	Lamur	94,000	01 : El Hamri; 02 : El Ghoualem; 03 : Emir Abdelkader; 04 : Essalem; 05 : Ennousair	01 : Lamur; 02 : Medioni; 03 : Cité Policière; 04 : Saint-Hubert; 05 : Les Abattoirs
12th c. d.	Sidi El Bachir	سيدي البشير	Plateau	100,000	01 : Sidi El Bachir; 02 : Mdina Jdida; 03 : Les Jeunes (El Chabab)	01 : Plateau; 02 : Ville Nouvelle; 03 : Cimtière Israëlite
13th c. d.	El Mokrani	المقراني	Sananès	90,000	01 : Abdelmoumen; 02 : Oussama; 03 : Othmania; 04 : Sidi El Hasni	01 : Choupot; 02 : Boulanger; 03 : Cuvelier; 04 : Sananès
14th c. d.	El Othmania	العثمانية	Maraval	165,000	01 : El Othmania; 02 : En-Nakhil; 03 : Yaghmoracen 1 et 2; 04 : Glycines; 05 : Khemisti	01 : Maraval; 02 : Les Palmiers; 03 : Yaghmoracen; 04 : Douanière; 05 : Fermes Perrier et St-Marie
15th c. d.	El Badr	البدر	Cité Petit	30,000	01 : El Badr; 02 : Mimoza	01 : Cité Petit; 02 : Mimosa
16th c. d.	Mahieddine	محي الدين	Eckmühl	...	01 : Mahieddine; 02 : Ennour; 03 : Kouchet El Djir; 04 : Arènes; 05 : Abdelkhalek Mohamed Amine Seghir; 06 : El Moustakbel; 07 : Essaada	01 : Eckmühl; 02 : 03 : 04 : Arènes; 05 : 06 : 07 : Protin
17th c. d.	Sidi El Houari	سيدي الهواري	Sidi El Houari	51,000	01 : Sidi El Houari; 02 : Sanaouber; 03 : Ras El Ain; 04 : Si Tewfik; 05 : Chabat 1 et 2; 06 : Sanaouber El Djadid; 07 : Mouni Mankour; 08 : Casbah El Atika	01 : Sidi El Houari; 02 : Les Planteurs; 03 : Raz El Ain; 04 : 05 : 06 : 07 : 08 :
18th c. d.	Bouamama	بوعمامة	El Hassi	78,000	01 : Hamidi Abdellah; 02 : El Feth; 03 : Bentazi; 04 : Ben Badaoui Yamina; 05 : Ben Dabache M’hamed; 06 : Zitouni Mustapha; 07 : Benarba Mahieddine; 08 : Medah Ahmed; 09 : Azouz Abdelkader	01 : 02 : Les Amandiers; 03 : 04 : 05 : 06 : 07 : Rocher; 08 : 09 :

== Historical quarters ==
=== El-Hamri ===
Landmarks include:

- Ahmed Zabana Stadium

=== Sidi El-Houari ===
Landmarks include:

- Hassan Pasha Mosque

== See also ==
- Oran Province (French: Wilaya d'Oran), est. 1968, containing the city of Oran^{(fr)}
- Oran (department) (French: Département d'Oran), French administrative area, 1848-1962, containing the city of Oran

== Bibliography ==
- M. Coquery (1962). "L'extension récente des quartiers musulmans d'Oran". Bulletin de l'Association de géographes français (in French). 39. ISSN 2275-5195 – via Persee.fr.
- Michel Coquery (1965). "Quartiers périphériques et mutations urbaines". Méditerranée (in French). 6. ISSN 1760-8538 – via Persee.fr.
- Jean Gilly; Jean-Claude Raguin (1971), Aspects géographiques de la structure sociale d'un quartier 'européen,' le quartier Front de Mer/Michelet, (Oran) après l'Indépendance (in French), Université de Paris I
- Belkacem Boumedini; Nebia Dadoua Hadria (2012). "Les noms des quartiers dans la ville d'Oran. Entre changement officiel et nostalgie populaire". Droit et cultures (in French) (64).
