= Jacques Chevallier (politician) =

French Algerian politician (1911–1971)

Mayor of Algiers
- In office 1953–1958
- Preceded by: Pierre-René Gazagne
- Succeeded by: Omar Mohamed Bouarouba

Personal details
- Born: 15 November 1911 Bourdeaux, France
- Died: 13 April 1971 (aged 59) Algiers, Algeria
- Spouse: Renée Missé (m. 1932)
- Children: 7, including Corinne Chevallier
- Education: University of Algiers

Jacques Chevallier (15 November 1911, in Bordeaux – 13 April 1971) was a liberal pied-noir mayor of Algiers who governed the city at the head of a coalition of pied noir and Muslim representatives.

He was also the secretary of state for war in the government of Pierre Mendès France.

Chevallier was born on 15 November 1911 in Bordeaux. His father Etienne Chavellier was an industrialist who also had lands in Algeria; his mother was born Corinne de la Bédoyère Huchet de Kernion. He studied at various Catholic colleges, including Notre Dame d’Afrique at Algiers, and at the University of Algiers where he obtained a degree in law. He married Renée Missé on 27 December 1932. They had five sons and two daughters, one of whom is the historian and novelist Corinne Chevallier.

After World War II, he helped Boris Souvarine to recreate the Institut d'histoire sociale (fr, institute for social history). He was the interim president of Institut d'Histoire Sociale from 1956 to 1957.

On 16 May 1955, Chevallier secured the parole of eleven FLN detainees who had been arrested after the November 1954 attacks, including Benyoucef Benkhedda, the future president of the Provisional Government of the Algerian Republic.

After Algerian independence in 1962, Chevallier was one of the few pieds noirs who took Algerian citizenship and remained in the new state.

Chevalier died of cancer in Algiers in 1971. His funeral was celebrated at Notre Dame du Mont Carmel in El Biar in the presence of Léon-Étienne Duval, the Archbishop of Algiers.

== Bibliography ==
Jacques Chevallier, Nous, Algériens, Calmann-Lévy, 1958 - 187 pages (scanned version)
