= Abdelaziz Ou Abbas =

Sultan of Ait Abbas from 1510 to 1559

- Sultan

Sultan of the Ait Abbas
- Reign: 1510–1559
- Predecessor: Ahmed I
- Successor: Ahmed II
- Died: January 1559; Kalâa of Ait Abbas
- Spouse: A princess of Kuku
- Kabyle name: Ɛebdelɛaziz U Ɛebbas
- Dynasty: Ait Mokran
- Father: Ahmed I
- Religion: Suffism
- Military career
- Conflicts: Algiers (1520); Oued Zadidja; Tlemcen (1551); Tuggurt; Kalaa (1553); Oued-el-Lhâm; Tlemcen (1557); Kalaa (1559)

Abdelaziz Ou Abbas (Kabyle: Ɛebdelɛaziz U Ɛebbas) was a Sultan of the Kingdom of Ait Abbas. He was the only ruler of the kingdom to hold the title of Sultan.

== Biography ==
He was the son of Ahmed, first sultan of the Kalâa of Ait Abbas, and brother of Ahmed Ait Mokran.

During his reign, the Kalaa became an important town and reached a population of 80,000 inhabitants. Abdelaziz also militarized the kingdom by building a weapon factory.

In 1551, he joined the expedition against the Saadi Sultanate, with an army of 2,000 soldiers.

He took part in the Tuggurt Expedition in 1552 with an army of 8,000 auxiliaries.

Around 1553, he concluded an alliance with the kingdom of Kuku and married the daughter of the king of Kuku.

Following the Expedition, his relation with Salah Rais deteriorated due to an inequitable share of the spoils, as well as the machinations of Hasan Corso, who convinced Salah Rais that Abdelaziz intended to incite a rebellion. After being invited by Salah Rais to stay at the Djenina Palace in order to resolve the conflict, Abdelaziz was the victim of an assassination attempt.

On the second day of the 1559 Siege of the Kalaa of Ait Abbas, he was struck by an arquebus shot in the chest and riddled with bullets along with his horse. His head was taken to Algiers by the Turks as a trophy.

It was later found that, during the battle, he was wearing two coats of mail and was armed with a spear, a shield and a cutlass.
