= Ahmed I Ait Mokran =

Founder of the Ait Mokran dynasty

- Sultan

Sultan of the Ait Abbas
- Reign: 1500–1510
- Successor: Abdelaziz Ou Abbas
- Died: 1510
- Issue: Abdelaziz Ou Abbas; Ahmed II
- Dynasty: Ait Mokran
- Father: Abderrahmane
- Religion: Sufism

Ahmed I (Kabyle: Ḥmed At Meqqran; died 1510) was the first sultan of the Kalâa of Ait Abbas.

== Biography ==
He was the son of Abderrahmane, last sultan of the Kalâa of Ait Hammad and father of Abdelaziz Ou Abbas, sultan of the Ait Abbas and Ahmed II, first amokrane of Ait Abbas.
