= First Battle of Kalaa of the Beni Abbes (1553) =

First Battle of Kalâa of the Ait Abbas
Date	1553
Location	Kalâa of Ait Abbas, Béjaïa Algeria
Result	Kingdom of Ait Abbas Victory • Maintaining the Kingdom of the Beni Abbes
Territorial changes	Kabyle Kingdom of Ait Abbas confirms its control over the Bibans and the Hodna

Belligerents
Kingdom of Ait Abbas	Regency of Algiers

Commanders and leaders
Abdelaziz Ou Abbas	Salah Rais

Strength
Unknown	2,000 Janissaries; 500 spahis 6,000 Arab cavaliers

Casualties and losses
Unknown	Unknown, but high

The First Battle of the Kalâa of the Ait Abbas took place during the winter of 1553 between the regency of Algiers and the Kingdom of Beni Abbas.

In order to counterbalance the influence of Sultan Abdelaziz of the Kalaa, Salah Rais ordered an expedition against the Kalaa of the Beni Abbes to annihilate his influence. The army of the Regency camped at Bona, a league from the Kalaa. Abdelaziz made a sortie against them and defeated them after a clash which was deadly for both sides. The armies of the Regency were forced to retreat after heavy losses, and this battle diminished their reputation. The victory allowed Sultan Abdelaziz to confirm his control over the Bibans and the Hodna. The following year the Regency of Algiers directed another expedition against Abdelaziz in the Battle of Oued-el-Lhâm.

== See also ==
- Second Battle of Kalaa of the Beni Abbes
- Kalâa of Ait Abbas
- Regency of Algiers
- Kingdom of Ait Abbas
- Campaign of Tlemcen (1551)
