= Betka Ait Mokran =

Amokrane of the Ait Abbas from 1600 to 1680

- Amokrane, Cheikh

3rd Amokrane of the Ait Abbas
- Reign: 1600–1680
- Predecessor: Naceur Ait Mokran
- Successor: Bouzid Ait Mokran

Cheikh of the Medjana
- Reign: 1600–1680
- Successor: Bouzid Ait Mokran
- Died: 1680; Medjana
- Issue: Bouzid; Abdallah; Aziz; Mohand Gandouz
- Kabyle name: Betka At Meqqran
- Dynasty: Ait Mokran
- Father: Naceur Ait Mokran
- Religion: Sufism
- Military career
- Conflicts: Guidjel

Betka Ait Mokran (Kabyle: Betka At Meqqran; died 1680) was an amokrane of the Kingdom of Ait Abbas and Cheikh of the Medjana, from 1600 to 1680.

== Biography ==
After the assassination of his father, Betka was taken in by the Hachem, a Berber tribe of the Medjana, and raised among them.

On September 20, 1638, he took part in the Battle of Guidjel against the Regency of Algiers, helping the Beylik of Constantine to get its independence from the Turks until 1647.

Betka managed to reconquer the lands of his grandfather but refused to take the title of "Sultan of the Kalâa" and assumed the title of "Sheikh of the Medjana" instead".

He died in 1680 in his fortress of Borj Mejdana.
