= Aït Abbas =

Kabyle tribe in Algeria

Aït Abbas At Ɛebbas
- Kabyle confederation
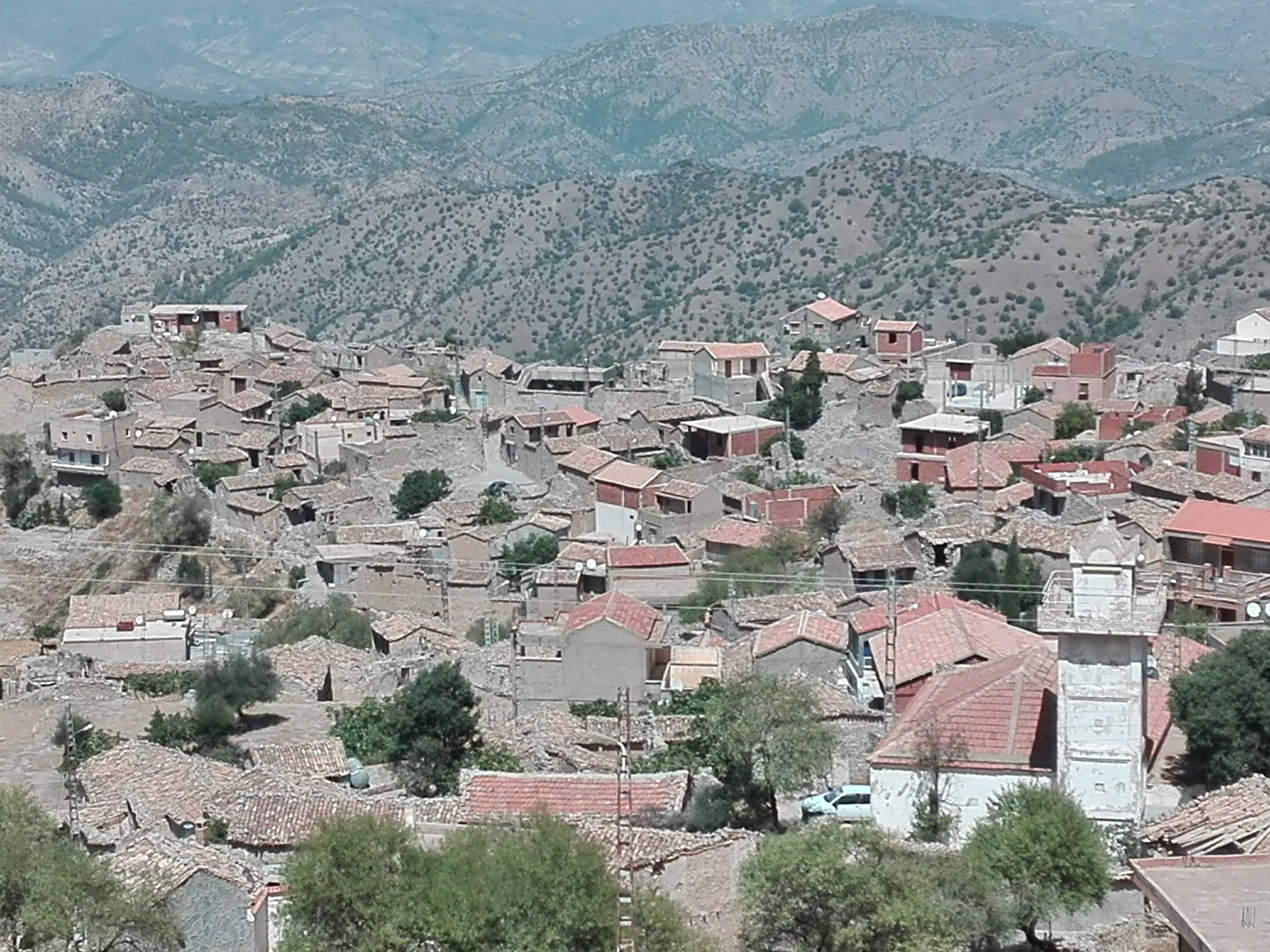
- The Kalâa of Ait Abbas.
- Ethnicity: Kabyles
- Location: Bibans
- Descended from: Kutama
- Language: Kabyle
- Religion: Islam

The Aït Abbas (Kabyle: At Ɛebbas, ⴰⵜ ⵄⴰⴱⴰⵙ) form a Kabyle confederation (Arch) established on the right bank of the Oued Sahel-Soummam in the Kabylie des Bibans in northern Algeria. Its leaders, of warrior nobility, were very influential throughout the region south of Béjaïa. Its origin is Kutama of the Sedouikich branch.

From the founding of Kalâa of Ait Abbas in the 16th century until the beginning of French colonization, the great chiefs of the Aït Abbas were recruited from among the descendants of Abdelaziz Labbes . The last chief was Cheikh El Mokrani, one of the leaders of the 1871 uprising. From the beginning of the century to the Algerian War, the Aït Abbas saw their reign gradually decline in economic and craft terms in Kabylie and the Sétif highlands.

== History ==
The Aït Abbas tribe could field 3,000 infantrymen in the 19th century. They are the most important tribe in the Soummam Valley. Its territory is very fertile. It is very rich in cereals, olive oil, various fruits, honey and wax. It has beautiful pastures and many livestock of all species. It is the tribe that is the seat of power of the Kingdom of Aït Abbas, which remained master of the Iron Gates and forced the Turks to pay a passage fee.

== Crafts ==
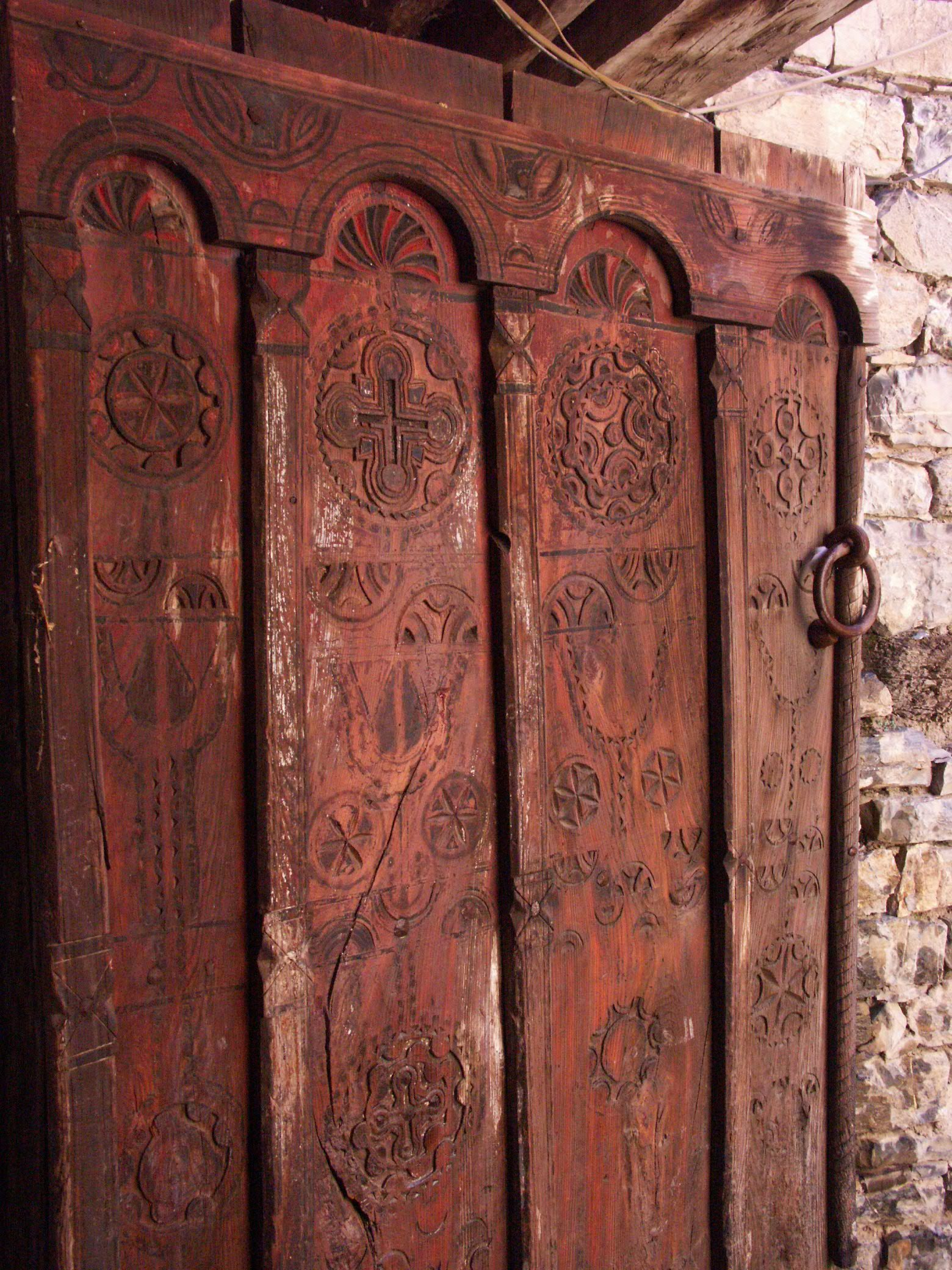
A traditional wooden door from the Aït Abbas region.

The region is known for its manufacture of carved wooden doors called in Kabyle: taggurt ta'âbbast, finely carved and decorated with rosettes and ironwork.
