= Naceur Ait Mokran =

Amokrane of the Ait Abbas from 1596 to 1600

- Amokrane

2nd Amokrane of the Ait Abbas
- Reign: 1596–1600
- Predecessor: Ahmed II
- Successor: Betka Ait Mokran
- Died: 1600
- Issue: Betka; Mohand; Bou Temzine
- Kabyle name: Naṣer At Meqqran
- Dynasty: Ait Mokran
- Father: Ahmed II
- Religion: Suffism
- Military career
- Conflicts: Algiers (1598)

Naceur Ait Mokran (Kabyle: Naṣer At Meqqran) was an Amokrane or the Kingdom of Ait Abbas.

== Biography ==
He was the son of Ahmed II Ait Mokran and father of Betka Ait Mokran, his successor, as well as Mohand Ait Mokran and Bou Temzine Ait Mokran.

Naceur focused on the religious aspect of the kingdom and surrounded himself with religious, letting the State affairs fall into disrepair which caused the discontent of the army leaders and traders of the Aït Abbas who assassinated him.

While the kingdom extended its control to the Zibans, Ouargla and Tuggurt, Naceur abandoned these regions, letting them under the control of the Douaouidas Berber tribes.
