= Ait Mokran =

Kabyle dynasty

Ait Mokran At Meqqran Mokranis
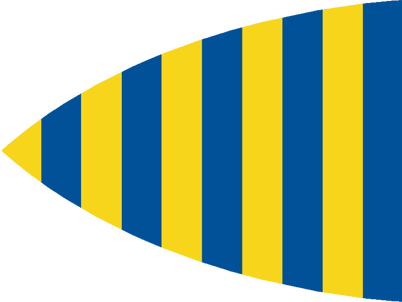
- Banner according to the Portuguese portolan, 1570.
- Parent family: Hammadids
- Country: Kingdom of Ait Abbas
- Current region: Kabylia
- Origin: Kalâa of Ait Abbas
- Founded: 1510
- Founder: Ahmed I
- Final ruler: Boumezrag Ait Mokran
- Historic seat: Kalâa of Ait Abbas; Medjana Fort
- Titles: Sultan of the Ait Abbas; Amokrane of the Ait Abbas; Cheikh of the Medjana; Sultan of the Medjana; Caliph of the Medjana
- Traditions: Suffism
- Deposition: 1872

The Ait Mokran (Kabyle: At Meqqran), also known as Mokranis, were a Kabyle Berber dynasty of who originate from the Kalâa of Ait Abbas and are known for ruling on the Kingdom of Ait Abbas. It was founded in 1510 by Ahmed, first king of the Kalâa.

== Etymology ==
The name 'Mokrani' derivates from the Berber word amokrane (Kabyle: ameqqran) meaning "great" or "leader". The name became a title under the rule of Ahmed Amokrane who ruled from 1556 to 1596.

== History ==
=== Origin ===
The Ait Mokran were a dynasty of Kabyle origin descended from the Hammadids, who fled in the 11th century to their stronghold in the Medjana and later to the Kalâa of Ait Abbas as they were overwhelmed by Arab incursions.

=== Revolt ===
In 1871, the Mokranis, led by Mohand Amokrane, revolted against the French colonial authority in what is known as the Mokrani Revolt. The suppression of the revolt by the French army marked a decisive turning point for the family. Following the conflict, the Mokrani lost their power, bringing an end to their political authority. Many Kabyle insurgents, including members of the dynasty, were deported to New Caledonia.

== Genealogy ==
The genealogy of the dynasty was reconstituted by the French historian Louis Rinn in his book "Histoire de l'insurrection de 1871 en Algérie":

- Hammadids
  - Abderrahmane (d. 1500), sultan of the Kalâa of Ait Hammad
    - Ahmed I (d. 1510), founder of the dynasty and first sultan of the Kalâa of Ait Abbas
      - Abdelaziz Ou Abbas (d. 1559), sultan of the Ait Abbas (1510–1559)
      - Ahmed II (d. 1596), amokrane (1559–1596)
        - Naceur Ait Mokran (d. 1600), amokrane (1596–1600)
          - Betka Ait Mokran (d. 1680), amokrane and 1st cheikh of the Medjana (1600-1680)
            - Bouzid I (d. 1735), amokrane and cheikh of the Medjana (1680–1735)
              - Abdesselem Amokrane (d. 1784), amokrane (1783–1784) and head of the Ait Abdesselem
                - Abdesselem (d. 1800)
                - Lhadj Mohand Abdesselem (d. 1847)
                  - Aichouch
                  - Messaoud, leader of Ain Taghrout (1848)
                  - Mohand, leader of Ain Taghrout (1855–1871)
              - Abderrebou (d. 1785)
              - Lhadj (d. 1783), amokrane (1735–1783) and head of the Ait Lhadj
                - Bouzid II (d. 1800), amokrane and cheikh of the Medjana (1784–1800)
                  - Ou Abdallah Amokrane (d. 1830), amokrane and cheikh of the Medjana (1800–1830)
                    - Mohand Ou Abdallah, leader of the Ayad tribe
                - Mohand
                  - Abderrahmane (d. 1850)
                    - Said Ou Boudaoud, leader of the Hodna (1871)
                  - Ahmed III (d. 1853), amokrane and cheikh of the Medjana (1831–1838)
                    - Mohand Lhadj Amokrane (1815–1871), amokrane, caliph of the Medjana and Bachaga
                    - Boumezrag Ait Mokran (1836–1906), last amokrane, leader of the Ouennougha and leader of the 1871 revolt
                - Daikra
              - Bourenane (d. 1780), head of the Ait Bourenane
            - Abdallah, eponymous ancestor of the Ait Abdallah tribe of Aumale
            - Aziz
            - Mohand Gandouz Amokrane, head of the Ait Gandouz
          - Mohand Amokrane (b. c. 1615), ancestor of the Aït Siar branch of the dynasty
          - Bou Temzine Amokrane (d. 1685), eponymous ancestor of the Temzania of the Bordjia tribe of Cacherou
      - Fadel (d. 1553), probably founder of a zawiya in Jijel

== Notes and references ==
=== Bibliography ===
- D. Abrous, « Mokrani (El-) / At Meqq°ran (famille) (El-Mokrani, Al-Moqrani...) », Encyclopédie berbère, 32 | 2010, 5056-5063.
