= Second Battle of Kalaa of the Beni Abbes (1559) =

Second Battle of Kalâa of the Beni Abbes
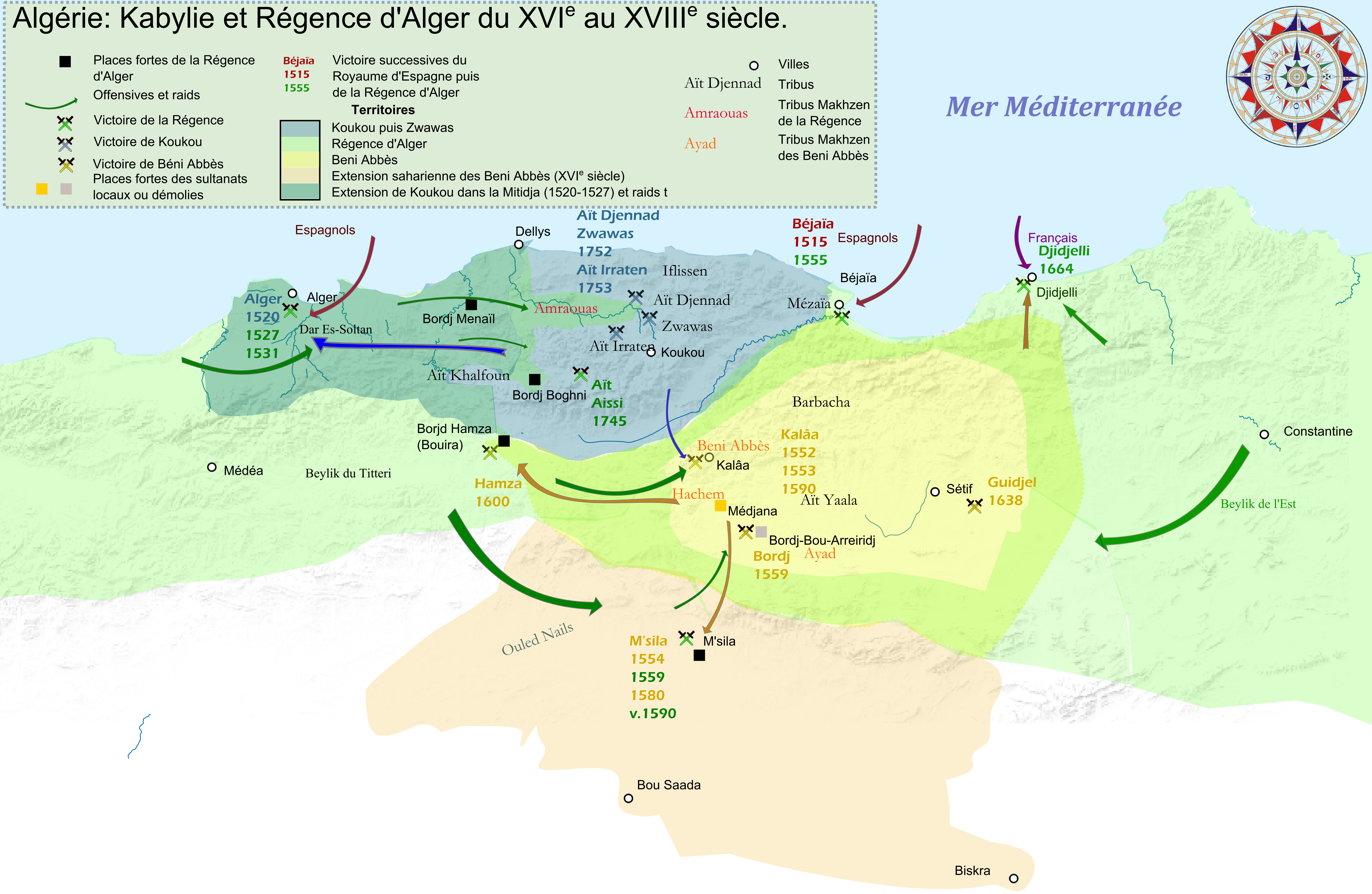
- Historic map of Kingdom Beni Abbès and Koukou.
Date	January–February 1559
Location	Kalâa of Ait Abbas, Béjaïa Algeria
Result	Peace with the Regency of Algiers • Maintaining the Kingdom of the Beni Abbes • withdrawal of the regency of Algiers Army
Territorial changes	No change

Belligerents
Kingdom of Ait Abbas; Supported by: Spanish Empire	Regency of Algiers; Kuku (Ally)

Commanders and leaders
Abdelaziz Ou Abbas †; Ahmed Ait Mokran	Hasan Bacha; Sultan Ben El Kadi

Strength
Kingdom of Ait Abbas : 4,000 infantry 5,000 cavaliers Spanish reinforcements : 1,000 man	Regency of Algiers : 3,000 arquebusiers 2,000 Janissaries; 500 spahis 6,000 Arab cavaliers Kingdom of Kuku : 1,500 infantry 300 cavaliers

Casualties and losses
Unknown	Unknown, but high

The Second Battle of Kalâa of the Ait Abbes took place in October 1559. It opposed the regency of Algiers and its ally of circumstance the Kingdom of Kuku to the Kingdom of Ait Abbas.

Hassan Pasha ordered an expedition against the capital of the kingdom, the Kalâa of Ait Abbas, to take revenge on the expedition of Sultan Abdelaziz of Kalaa, which had destroyed the forts of Medjana and Bordj Bou Arréridj, in order to annihilate his influence. On the second day of the fighting, Sultan Abdelaziz was killed. His brother Sultan Ahmed Amokrane succeeded him, and his soldiers maintained their position. After eight days, Hassan Pasha, seeing that his position had not evolved, and his army was experiencing losses every day, as well as difficulties related to the terrain, had to retreat. Nevertheless, the Turks returned to Algiers with the head of the sultan Abdelaziz as a trophy

== See also ==
- First Battle of Kalâa of the Ait Abbas
- Kalâa of Ait Abbas
- Regency of Algiers
- Kingdom of Ait Abbas
- Kingdom of Tlemcen
