= Ahmed II Ait Mokran =

Amokrane of the Ait Abbas from 1559 to 1596

- Amokrane
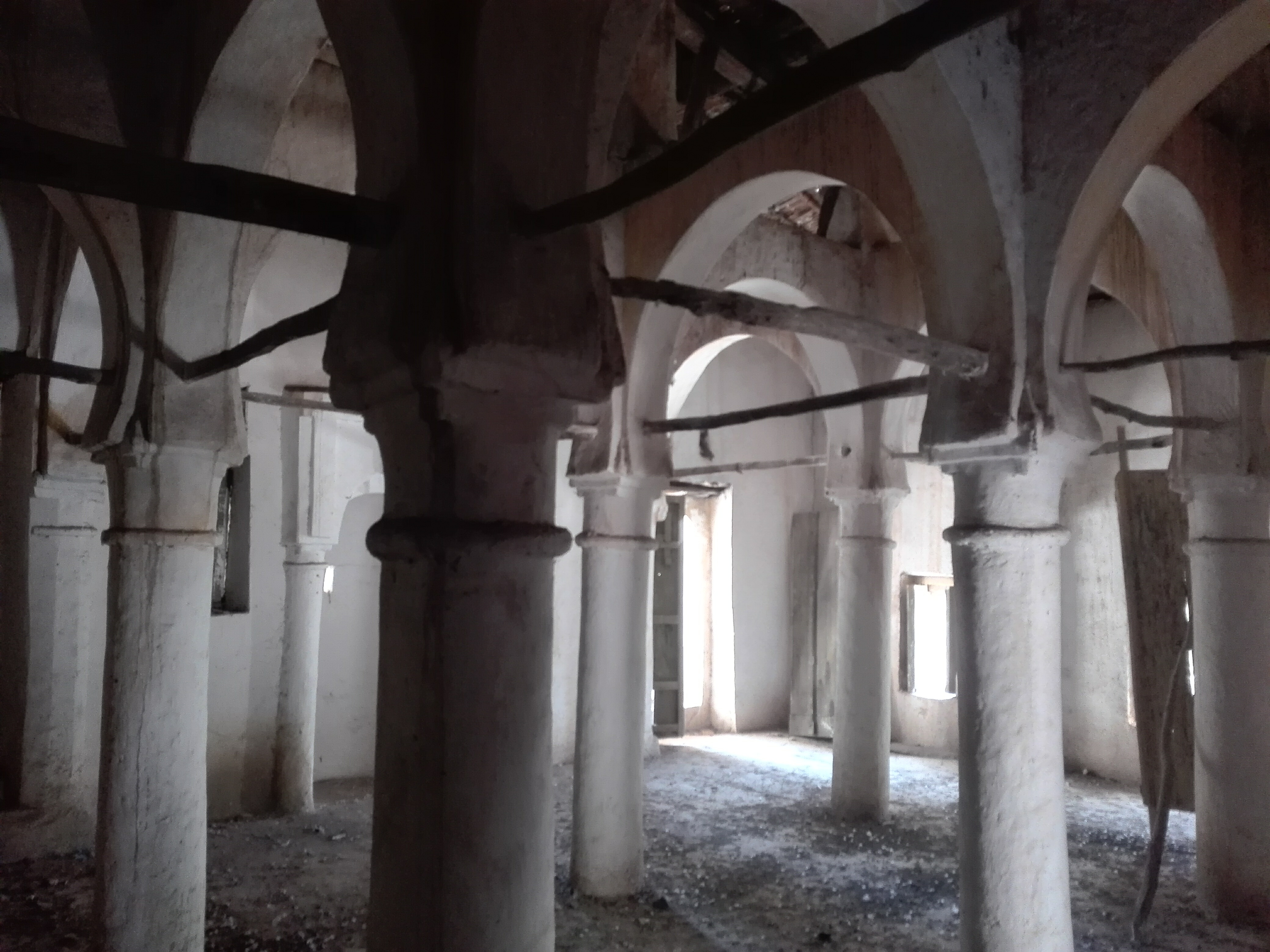
- Mausoleum of Ahmed Ait Mokran in the Kalâa.

1st Amokrane of the Ait Abbas
- Reign: 1559–1596
- Predecessor: Abdelaziz
- Successor: Naceur Ait Mokran
- Died: 1596
- Burial: Kalâa of Ait Abbas
- Issue: Naceur Ait Mokran
- Kabyle name: Ḥmed At Meqqran
- Dynasty: Ait Mokran
- Father: Ahmed
- Mother: A princess of Kuku
- Religion: Sufism
- Military career
- Conflicts: Kalaa (1559); Kalaa (1590)

Ahmed II (Kabyle: Ḥmed At Meqqran) was an amokrane of the Kingdom of Ait Abbas, during the 16th century.

== Biography ==
In 1559, Ahmed succeeded his brother, Sultan Abdelaziz, becoming the first ruler to adopt the title of amokrane.

Following the death of his brother, he continued the wars against the Regency of Algiers. During his reign, the Kingdom of Ait Abbas reached its territorial peak. Ahmed expanded his authority southwards toward the Sahara and the Ouled Naïl Range, extending his influence as far as the oases of Tolga, Biskra, Touggourt and Laghouat.

In 1598, he occupied Algiers during an expendition against the Regency of Algiers.

Around 1600, Ahmed led an attack on Fort Hamza near Bouira. Despite winning, Ahmed was killed during the battle.
