= Battle of Oued Zadidja =

- Part of Conflicts between the Regency of Algiers and Morocco
Date	1551
Location	Near the Chelif valley
Result	Algerian Victory

Belligerents
Saadi Sultanate	Regency of Algiers; Kingdom of Ait Abbas

Commanders and leaders
Mohammed El Harrane; Moulay Abdelkader	Hasan Corso; Abdelaziz Amokrane

Strength
21,000 horsemen 10,000 infantry	8,000 Kabyles; 5,000 musketeers 1,000 spahis

Casualties and losses
Unknown	Unknown

The Battle of Oued Zadidja occurred in 1551 after the Saadians violated an alliance with the Regency of Algiers, the Saadians were defeated and their leader was killed.

The inhabitants of Tlemcen appealed to the Sharif of Fez as they had complained about the Spaniards and the Turks. They asked to send the brother of their King who had been installed by Hassan Pasha but then expelled by Count Alcaudete, this was because the King who reigned was an oppressor to the Muslims as he overcharged them for taxes to pay his tribute to the King of Spain. The Pasha of Algiers attempted to dissuade the Sharif by inviting him to march against the Spaniards in Oran. For this purpose Hasan Corso was given the command of 5,000 musketeers, 1,000 spahis and 8,000 Kabyles brought by Abdelaziz. An alliance was concluded with the Saadians against Oran. Mohammed al-Shaykh sent his sons Mohammed El Harrane and Abdelkader at the head of 21,000 horsemen and 10,000 infantry. The agreement was that the Algerians and Saadians would meet up at Ain Temouchent and the two allied armies were to seize Oran. The Saadians violated this agreement and entered Tlemcen and made themselves masters of the city, Moulay Abdallah occupied Tlemcen with a strong garrison while his brother ravaged the territory of the Beni Amer.

A group of the Beni Amer who were pursued by the Saadians arrived at a camp situated in the Regency of Algiers and appealed for help. Hasan Corso advanced into the Chelif valley where the Sharifian general was operating, Hasan Corso chased, defeated and killed the Saadian general.

The commandment in Tlemcen then requested help and Mohammed al-Shaykh sent his three sons, this would result in a battle near the Abou Azoun river resulting in an Algerian victory.
