= Battle of Oued-el-Lhâm =

Date	1554
Location	Oued el Ham, M’Sila
Result	Decisive Kingdom of Ait Abbas victory

Belligerents
Kingdom of Ait Abbas	Regency of Algiers

Commanders and leaders
Abdelaziz Labbes	Sinan Reis

Strength
Unknown	3,000 or 4,000 men

Casualties and losses
Unknown	Heavy losses

The Battle of Oued-el-Lhâm was a battle between the Regency of Algiers and the Kingdom of Beni Abbas that took place one year after the Battle of Kalaa which led to this attempt for revenge by the Regency.

The independent Kabyle Kingdom of Beni Abbas had enjoyed friendly relations with the Regency of Algiers and even fought together against the Saadians in 1551. In 1552 Salah Reis and Sultan Abdelaziz of Kalaa led a joint successful expedition to Touggourt and Ouargla. Salah Reis advanced with 3000 musketeers and 1000 spahis as well as 8000 Kabyle auxiliaries commanded by Sultan Abdelaziz. Salah Reis stormed Touggourt after a four-day siege and conquered Ouargla, chastised the inhabitants, imposing a huge fine on two chiefs and returned to Algiers with a huge booty including gold and 5000 slaves. Sultan Abdelaziz was unhappy with the share of booty that had been allocated to him and therefore the Turks suspected him of being an enemy and Hassan Corso denounced him as such. These events are what caused the conflict between Sultan Abdelaziz and the Regency of Algiers.

In 1553 Sultan Abdelaziz defeated the Turks in the Battle of Kalaa which made them hungry for revenge. The following year Sinan Reis commanded three or four thousand men in an expedition against Sultan Abdelaziz. Abdelaziz attacked Sinan Reis at Oued-el-Lhâm where he massacred the Turks and emerged victorious from the battle.
