= Campaign of Tlemcen (1551) =

Algerian expedition

Coordinates: 34°52′58″N 01°19′00″W

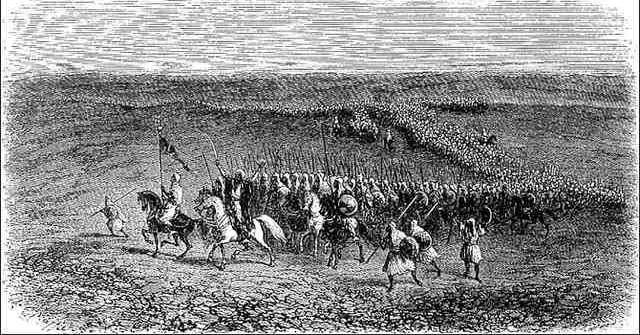
- The troops of the regency of Algiers allied to the kingdom of Beni Abbes marching towards Oranie (19th century engraving)
Date	January 1551
Location	Tlemcen
Result	Algerian victory
Territorial changes	Direct rule established in Tlemcen; The Moulouya river is imposed as the border

Belligerents
Regency of Algiers; Kingdom of Beni Abbas	Saadi Sultanate; Spanish Empire

Commanders and leaders
Hasan Pasha; Abdelaziz Ou Abbas	Mohammed al-Shaykh; Moulay Abdelkader †; Moulay Abdallah; Count of Alcaudete

Units involved
Algerian forces: 10,000 men Abelaziz's forces: 10,000 men Total: 20,000	Saadian force: 10,000 infantry Saadian Prince Abd el Kader’s reinforcements: 22,000 mounted lancers Total: 32,000 or 40,000

Casualties and losses
Unknown	Moroccan garrison in Tlemcen massacred
- Location of the battle of Tlemcen (1551) in Algeria.

The Campaign of Tlemcen (1551) was a military operation led by the Regency of Algiers under Hasan Pasha and his ally Abdelaziz, following the capture of Tlemcen by the Saadi Sultanate in June 1550. The Saadian forces were defeated at the Abou Azoun river and the Moroccan garrison in Tlemcen was massacred.

== Background ==
In 1545, the Saadians allied themselves with the Spaniards. In 1547 the janissaries lost Tlemcen to the Spanish after Count Alcaudete entered the city and installed a puppet ruler. The Saadians took Tlemcen without a battle in 1550 and decided to march from there on Algiers. The beylerbeys of Algiers and the sultan of Beni Abbas concluded at the same time the "pact of Aguemoun Ath Khiar".

The inhabitants of Tlemcen who had complained about the Turks and Spaniards appealed to the Sharif in Fez who answered them favourably. The people of Tlemcen wrote that their current King was an oppressor to the Muslims as he overcharged them for taxes to pay his tribute to the King of Spain. The pasha of Algiers attempted to dissuade him by inviting him to march against the Spaniards in Oran, Hassan Corso was given the command of an army composed of 5,000 musketeers, 1,000 spahis and 8,000 Kabyles brought by Abdelaziz. Mohammed ash-Shaykh dispatched his sons Abdelkader and Mohammed El Harrane at the command of 21,000 horsemen and 10,000 infantry. Mohammed El Harrane entered Tlemcen in June 1551 while the Emir of Tlemcen took refuge in Oran. The gates of Tlemcen were thrown open to him with such alacrity as to suggest that contacts had been made in advance with its people. The Saadian prince then, against the instructions of his father, sent his troops to subjugate the tribes of the plains of Oran, however a group of the Beni Amer who were pursued by the Moroccans arrived at a camp in the Regency of Algiers and asked for help. Hassan Corso advanced into the Chelif valley where the Sharifian general was operating, Hassan Corso pursued him then defeated him and killed him. The commander of Tlemcen then requested help and ash-Shaykh sent his three sons. This episode marks the beginning of the hostility between the regency of Algiers and the Saadians, which ceased only in 1585 with the intervention of the Ottoman Empire.

== Battle ==
The Saadian troops were described as considerable; according to Haedo they consisted of 12,000 horsemen and 10,000 infantrymen (including 5,000 renegades). According to Ernest Mercier the Saadian army was composed of 21,000 horsemen. Finally, according to a Spanish document, the Moroccan army had a total of 40,000 men.

The expedition was to include two main offensive movements. An army of 10,000 men, including 5,000 renegades and 2,000 Berbers from Little Kabylia, commanded by Abdelaziz, took charge of protecting Mostaganem from the Saadians, who were supported by the Spaniards. They also had to swell their ranks by rallying the local Arab tribe of Beni Amer. They had to defeat the Saadian troops on its way from Tlemcen to Mostaganem. The purpose of the first operation was to prevent any backward movement on the part of the latter and to protect the reconquest movement towards Tlemcen.

Faced with the advance of the troops coming from Algiers, the Saadian troops retreated while they were campaigning in the Algerian west. However, they were overtaken by the troops of Hassan Corso.

The Saadian troops were surprised and defeated at a place called Abu Azoun river (or Rio Salado) by the contingents of Hassan Pasha. Abdelaziz El Abbes had killed the Saadian prince Moulay Abdelkader and cut off his head which was later taken to Algiers as a trophy and displayed in an iron cage above the Bab Azoun gate. The booty of this surprise attack was important, and favorable to Hassan Pasha.

The Saadians were pursued as far as the Moulouya, but the Algerian troops did not carry their success any further. The victory of the Algerians was for the most part due to the courage of Abdelaziz and his Kabyles. The Regency of Algiers established direct rule over the city of Tlemcen.

== Aftermath ==
Despite this defeat ash-Sheikh organised another expedition with his three sons in command of an army of 17,000 men to again attempt to annex the territory of the Regency of Algiers. ash-Sheikh had believed that the conditions were favourable for him to expand his territory at the expense of the Regency because the Ottomans were fighting on two fronts. This did not go to plan and the expedition sent by ash-Sheikh was severely defeated and pursued as far as the Moulouya. After his defeat he welcomed with respect the ambassador of Salah Reis, Muhammad al - Kharrûbî, who negotiated the end of the conflict and confirmation of the border as the Moulouya river.

== See also ==
- First Battle of Kalaa of the Beni Abbes (1553)
- Battle of Kalaa of the Beni Abbes (1559)
- Kingdom of Tlemcen
