= Siege of Algiers (1598) =

Date	1598
Location	Algiers
Result	Victory of Regency of Algiers
Territorial changes	No changes

Belligerents
Kingdom of Beni Abbas	Regency of Algiers

Commanders and leaders
Ahmed Amokrane	

Casualties and losses
Unknown	Unknown

The siege of Algiers was an expedition carried by the Beni Abbas a kabyle kingdom , the expedition was carried on the Mitidja plain.

The Beni Abbas were able to reach the Bab Azoune but couldn't occupy the city.

The kabyles camped for 11 days in the gardens of Bab Azoune until a successful Turkish sortie forced them to leave. This directly led to Dari Hassan Bou Richa replacing Mustapha due to his incapacity to pacify the Kabyle revolts and was imprisoned in Constantinople for this motif .
