= Cheikh Mokrani =

Leader of the Mokrani Revolt of 1871

Sheikh Mohand Ait Mokran
- Muḥend At Meqqran
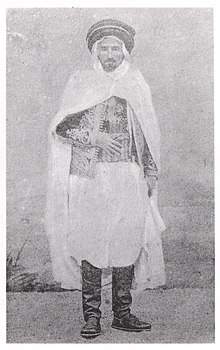
- Born: 1815; Kalâa of Ait Abbas (now Ighil Ali) Kingdom of Ait Abbas
- Died: May 5, 1871 (aged 55–56); Taouraga, Boumerdès, French Algeria
- Title: Sheikh
- Predecessor: Ahmed III
- Successor: Boumezrag Ait Mokran
- Father: Ahmed III
- Relatives: Boumezrag Ait Mokran (brother)
- Family: Ait Mokran
- Military career
- Children: Boumezrag Ouannoughi Ait Mokran
- Allegiance: Kingdom of Ait Abbas
- Conflicts: Mokrani Revolt

Sheikh Mohand Amokrane (Kabyle: Lḥaǧ Muḥend n Ḥmed n At-Meqqran, Arabic: الشيخ محمد المقراني; d. 1871), also known as Mohamed El-Mokrani, was one of the principal leaders and the namesake of the Mokrani Revolt of 1871 against the French occupation of Algeria.

== Early life ==
El-Mokrani was a descendant of the rulers of the Kingdom of Beni Abbas, descendants of Abderrahmane of Djebel Ayad. The Amokrane, had been rulers since the sixteenth century of the Kalâa of Ait Abbas in the Bibans and of the Medjana region. In the 1830s, Cheikh Mokrani's father Ahmed El Mokrani (d. 1853), had chosen to ally himself with the French invaders. It was Ahmed El Mokrani who had allowed the Iron Gates expedition of 1839 and he had become khalifa of the Medjana under the tutelage of the French authorities. This alliance had soon revealed itself to be a form of subordination - a decree of 1845 abolished the khalifalik of Medjana so that when Mohamed succeeded his father, as the choice of the French Arab Bureaux, his title was no more than “bachagha” (Turkish: başağa=chief commander).

== Mokrani Revolt ==
After the death of Ahmed Amokrane, the French authorities appointed Mohamed El- Mokrani in his place. However following dissension with the French administration, he resigned from his position in March 1871. This conflict happened as a result of the colonial authorities disregarding Amokrane, creating a French-populated commune at Bordj Bou Arréridj and appointing a French officer as its head. Many of the indigenous population rallied to the banners of the Cheikh; their wide-spread discontent aggrieved by the ravages of famine, increasing racial oppression by the French and a Christianization policy pursued by the Catholic church. French defeats in the Franco-Prussian War of 1870-71 undermined the authority of the occupying power.

In March 1871 Mohamed El-Mokrani revolted against the French, providing sole leadership of the rising and joined by Bordj-Bou-Arréridj. The latter was assisted by his brother Boumezrag and his cousin El-Hadj Bouzid; plus Sheikh Mohand Meziane Ahaddad of Saddouk Oufella, a great scholar theologian of the Zaouia Tarahmanit who joined this uprising with his tribe. Using his position and influence on the Rahmania brotherhood Sheikh Mohand-Amokrane was able to overcome dissension in the rebel camp and retake Bordj-Bou-Arreridj.

The members of the Rahamania Brotherhood: disciples of the Sheik Ahaddad (El Haddad); played an eminent part in the success of the insurrection of El Mokrani (Amokrane), in particular after Sheikh Ahaddad (El Haddad) had proclaimed war against the French on April 8, 1871. The insurrection acquired a general character through the increase in the number of combatants who joined it and its extension to the west, north and the east where outposts of the colonial army were encircled in several areas.

After having won several battles, Mohamed El-Mokrani was killed on May 5, 1871, at Taouraga. His tomb is located in Kollaa N'at-Abbas (Bgayet) (Béjaïa). Under the command of his brother Boumzrag (Boumezreg), the uprising continued until January 20, 1872. Boumzrag was captured and deported to New Caledonia; a French island in the Pacific.

After the arrest of Sheik-el-Haddad, the jihad continued under Bouamama. There were also other small insurrectionary movements at Blessed-Menaceur, where rebel forces besieged Cherchel, Zurich, Vesoul-Benian and Hammam-Rirha. This movement was also crushed. From July to September 1872, French forces had still to completely subdue the Kabylie. Bou-Mezrag took refuge at Maadid, and later managed to escape the French forces finding allies among the Tuareg tribes of the South. General Delacroix with a small expeditionary force, continued to pursue the rebels beyond Ouargla. Bou-Mezrag Mokrani, who had been for six days without drink or food, was finally captured.

The insurrection, which had begun on March 16, 1871, in Medjana, finished on January 20, 1872, with the arrest of Bou-Mezrag. A third part of Algeria had been affected by the rising and there had been about 200.000 combatants under the rebel flag.

The exile of the brother of El-Mokrani and the whole family to the New Caledonia occurred shortly afterwards. Together with them 212 persons, called Kabyles du Pacifique, who had participated in the revolt were tried and deported by French authorities to labor camps on the island of New Caledonia. Mokrani's descendants still live on the island.
