= Battle of Guidjel =

1638 battle

- Part of Revolt of Ben Sakheri; War between the regency of Algiers and the Kabyles
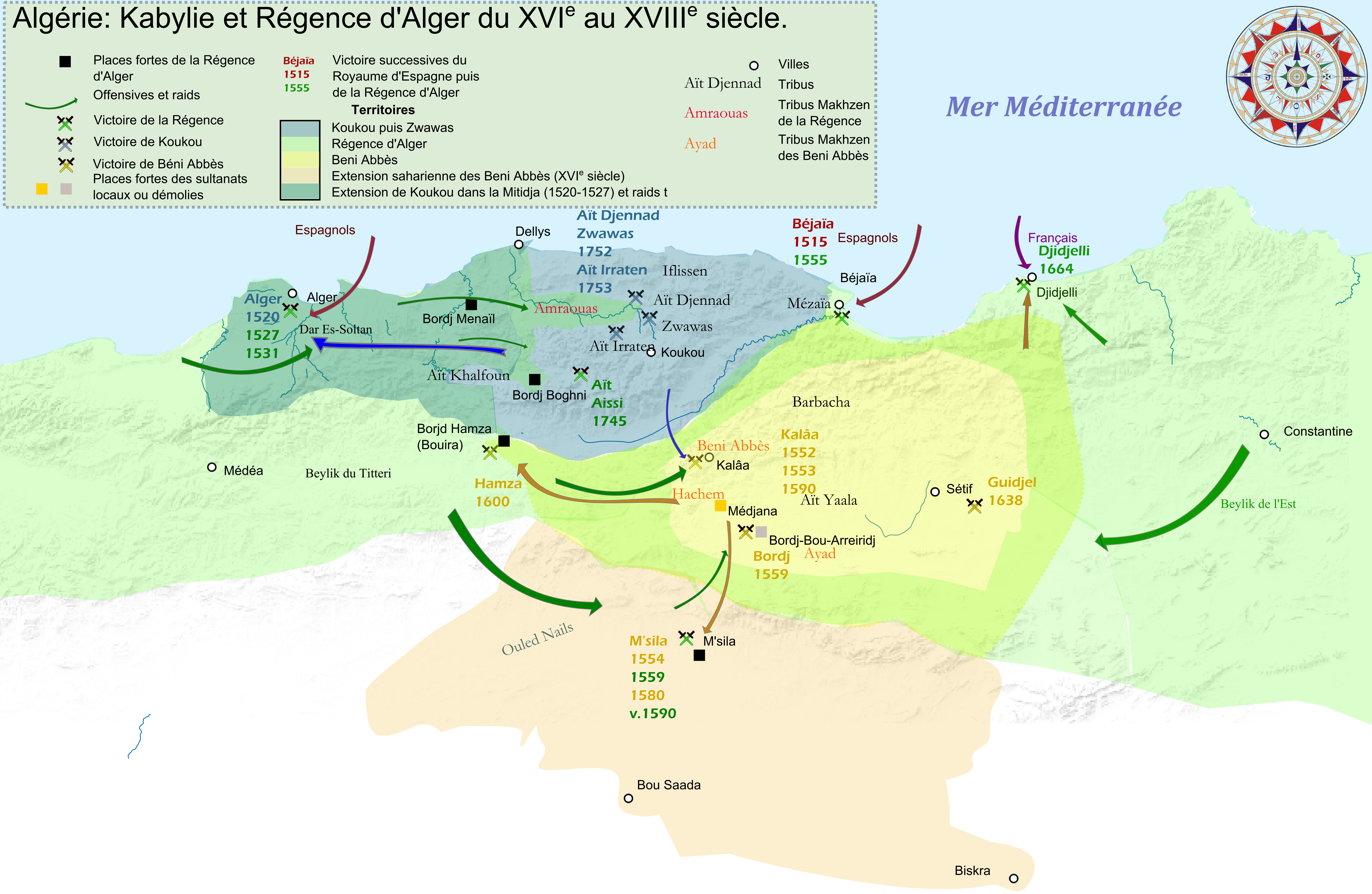
Date	20 September 1638
Location	Guidjel (Regency of Algiers)
Result	Rebel victory
Territorial changes	Loss of control of the entire region of Constantine by the regency of Algiers for 9 years

Belligerents
Rebel tribes of Ben Sakheri; Tribal confederation of Hanencha; Kingdom of Beni Abbas	Regency of Algiers: Beylik of the East; Reinforcements from Algiers

Commanders and leaders
Ben Sakheri (cheikh el arab); Betka-el-Moqrani (sultan of Beni Abbes)	Mourad Bey (bey of Constantine); Caïd Youssef (Detachment of Algiers)

Units involved
Allied tribes	6,000 men mainly Turks

Casualties and losses
Unknown	Unknown, but very heavy

The Battle of Guidjel, or Battle of Guedjal, was a battle between the regency of Algiers and feudal lords of the Beylik of Constantine, including Sheikh Ahmed ben Sakheri ben Bouokkaz, cheikh el arab (Note: According to Ernest Mercier, Sheikh el Arab is one of the main lords of the Beylik of the East, at the head of the southern tribes (Hodna and Zibans): Ernest Mercier, Histoire de Constantine, 1903, p. 212) of the Beylik and Betka-el-Moqrani, Sultan of the Beni Abbès .

== Description ==
The battle took place in 1638, in the context of a challenge to the authority of the regency of Algiers by tribal and feudal chiefs from eastern Algeria, known as the "Ben Sakheri Revolt". The battle pitted a coalition of tribes, including nomads, against each other, who inflicted a severe defeat on the armies of the Bey of Constantine and reinforcements from Algiers.

== Bibliography ==
- Gaïd, Mouloud (1978). Chroniques des Beys de Constantine. Alger: Office des publications universitaires. p. 160.
