= Tuggurt Expedition (1552) =

Military conflict

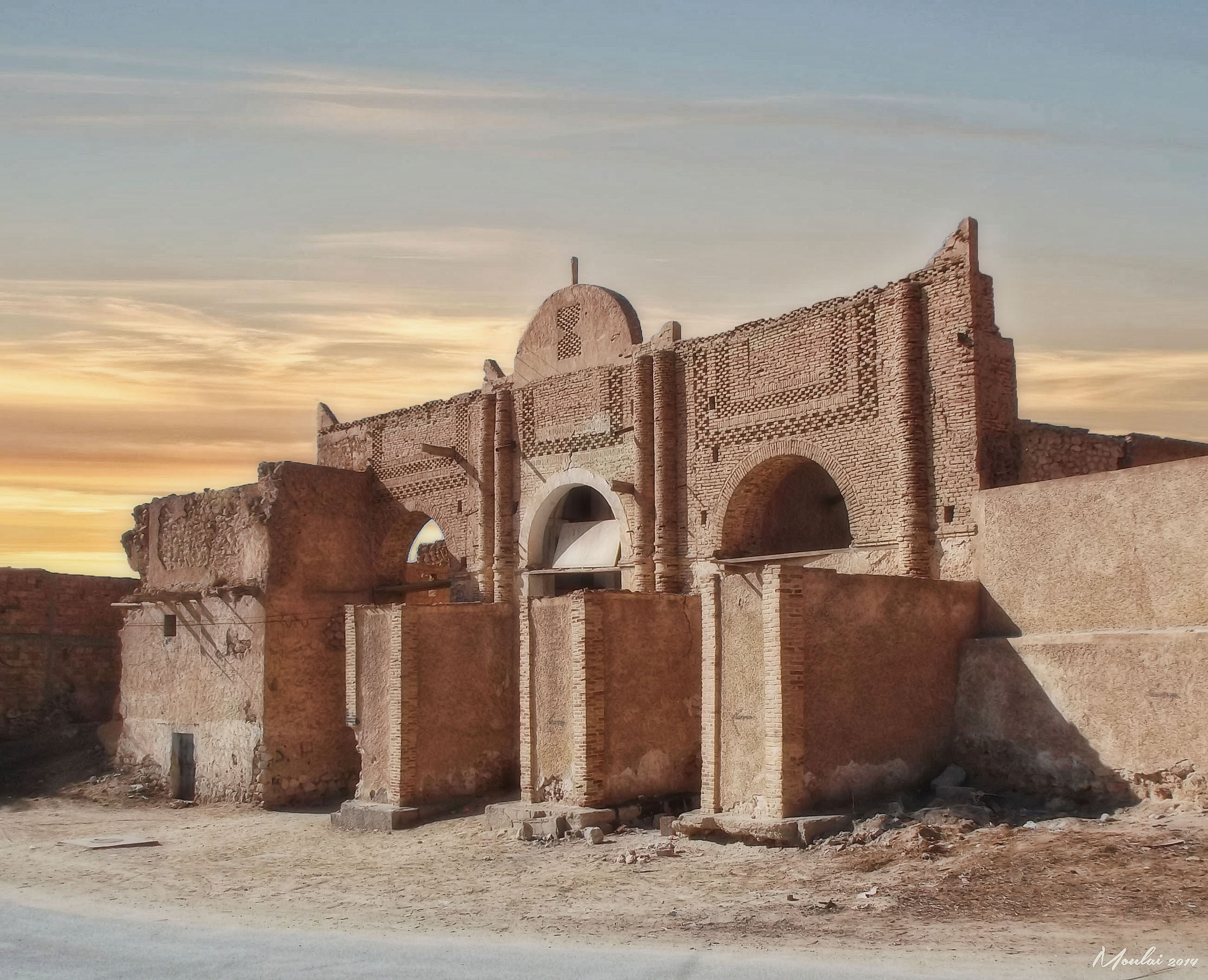
Date	October 1552
Location	Tuggurt, Biskra and Wargla, Algeria
Result	Algerian victory
Territorial changes	The Sultanate of Tuggurt and Sultanate of Wargla became vassals of the Regency of Algiers

Belligerents
Regency of Algiers (Kingdom of Beni Abbas) Kingdom of Ait Abbas	Sultanate of Tuggurt

Commanders and leaders
Salah Rais (Kingdom of Beni Abbas) Abdelaziz Ou Abbas	Ahmed II

Strength
Regency of Algiers : 1,000 spahis 3,000 musketeers some pieces of artillery Kingdom of Ait Abbas : 8,000 Kabyle auxiliaries	Unknown

Casualties and losses
Unknown	Unknown, but high

The Tuggurt expedition in 1552 aimed to obtain the submission of the Saharan cities of Tuggurt and Ouargla, seats of independent sultanates. Salah Rais, beylerbey of the Regency of Algiers, was allied to the troops of the Kingdom of Ait Abbas, led by their sultan, Abdelaziz Ou Abbas.

The sultan of Tuggurt, head of two prosperous cities and Saharan principalities, refused to pay tribute to the regency of Algiers, which therefore launched an expedition to subdue him and also take control at the same time of a caravan route for the Trans-Saharan trade in gold. Salah Rais, at the head of 1,000 spahis and 3,000 musketeers, as well as some pieces of artillery, was joined by 8,000 Kabyle auxiliaries from the Beni Abbes.

In passing Salah Raïs subdued Biskra, previously attacked in 1542 by Hassan Pasha, because it had refused to pay tribute. Continuing south, he laid siege to Tuggurt for four days before conquering Ouargla. The local sultan, only 14 years old, retreated behind the city walls and hoped that the surrounding tribes, hostile to the Turks, would come to his rescue. Salah Raïs bombarded the city's defenses with cannon for three days. On the fourth day he attacked, massacred the city's inhabitants, and captured the young sultan.

Salah Rais plundered the town, reputed to possess gold in quantity. He then took the road south to Ouargla. Faced with the methods of Salah Rais, the city's inhabitants fled and its sultan retreated with 4,000 horsemen towards El Golea. Only African merchants and marabouts remained when Salah Raïs arrived. The two sultanates surrendered and promised to pay tribute, so Salah Reis and Abdelaziz returned to Algiers with a large booty that included gold and 5,000 slaves

== Bibliography ==
- Hugh Roberts, Berber Government: The Kabyle Polity in Pre-colonial Algeria, Boston, I.B.Tauris, 2014, 352 p. (ISBN 1845112512)
- Mouloud Gaïd [in French] (1978). Chroniques des Beys de Constantine [Chronicles of the Beys of Constantine]. Algiers: Office des publications universitaires. p. 160 – via Google Books.
- Laurent-Charles Féraud, Histoire Des Villes de la Province de Constantine : Sétif, Bordj-Bou-Arreridj, Msila, Boussaâda, [History of the Cities of Constantine Province] vol. 5, Constantine, Arnolet, 1872 (reprinted 2011), 456 p. (ISBN 978-2-296-54115-3)
