= Hasan Corso =

Mayor of Algiers

Hasan Corso (born Pietro Paolo Tavera) was the mayor of Algiers and caliph of Salah Rais.

Corso was born on the island of Corsica. When he was five years old, he was taken away to Istanbul, and became a member of the janissaries. He was giving military education and educated in the Muslim religion and Turkish language. The Turkish gave him the name Hassan Corso, and sent him to Algiers. He rapidly rose through the janissary ranks and earned the title of Agha. One of his principal lieutenants, Ali Sardo, was a European convert to Islam as well, from the neighbouring island of Sardinia.

In 1549, he became mayor of Algiers and caliph of Salah Rais. He was murdered at the age of 38 in August 1556, on the orders of a pasha sent from Istanbul.
