= Bibans =

Mountain chain in northern Algeria

- البيبان
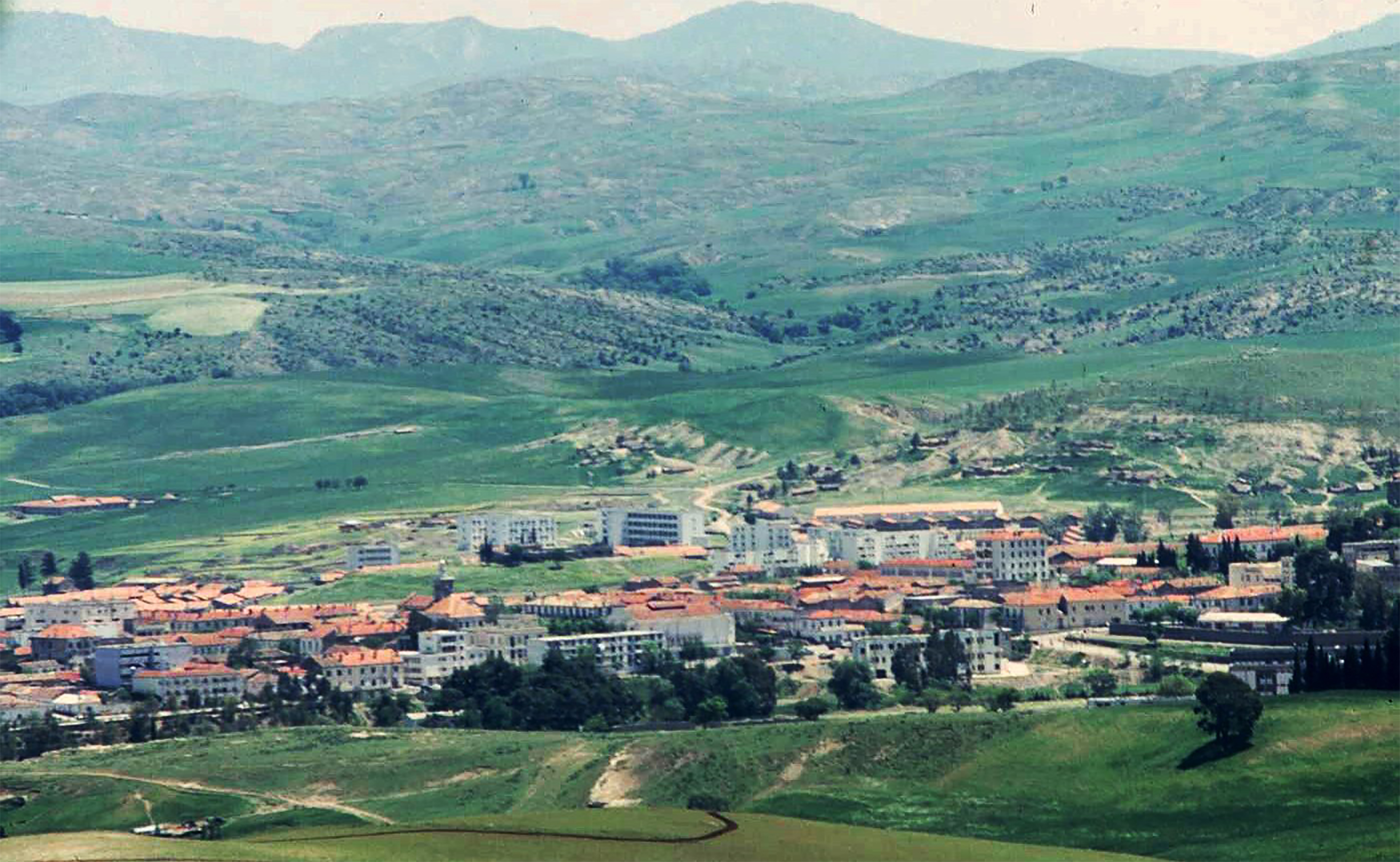
- View of the Bibans in Sour El-Ghozlane

Highest point
- Peak: Mansoura
- Elevation: 1,862 m (6,109 ft)
- Coordinates: 36°11′0″N 4°26′0″E

Geography
- Location within Algeria
- Location: Kabylie, Algeria
- Parent range: Tell Atlas

Topographic map of Kabylia showing the location of the Bibans.

The Bibans or Biban Range (Arabic: البيبان, Kabylian: Tiggoura, French: Chaîne des Bibans or Les Bibans) are a chain of mountains in northern Algeria, bordering the south of Kabylie.

== Geography ==
The highest summits are 1862 m high Mansoura (جبل منصورة) and 1832 m high Choukchout (جبل شوكشوط). Located to the east of the Blidean Atlas and to the west of the Hodna Mountains, the Bibans are a subrange of the Tell Atlas, part of the Atlas Mountain System.

The strategic Iron Gates mountain passes are located in the range and gave their name to the Biban Mountains. The main gorge is the deep Bab al-Kabir (Big Door), cut by the Ouadi Chebba, through which the railway line between Algiers and Constantine passes. The Bab al-Saghir (Little Door) of the Oadi Buktun is located 3.5 km to the east.

Some authors claim that the range was known as El Ouennougha before the French colonization of Algeria. Traditionally these mountains have been populated by Kabyle people. In present days the Kabyle populations are found in the centre and the eastern part of the range, while the western end is home to Arabophone communities. Local people use to practice goat rearing and beekeeping, as well as growing olives for the production of olive oil. Ancient oil mills have been preserved in certain villages.

== Protected areas ==
The 200,000 ha Saharan Atlas National Park is a protected area located near Hammam Dhalaa on the southeastern side of the range, 15 km north of M'Sila. Established in 1992, it is a refuge for about hundred Cuvier's gazelles.

== See also ==
- List of mountains in Algeria
- Iron Gates (Algeria)
- Petite Kabylie
