= Kalâa of Ait Abbas =

Coordinates: 36.295°N 4.580°E

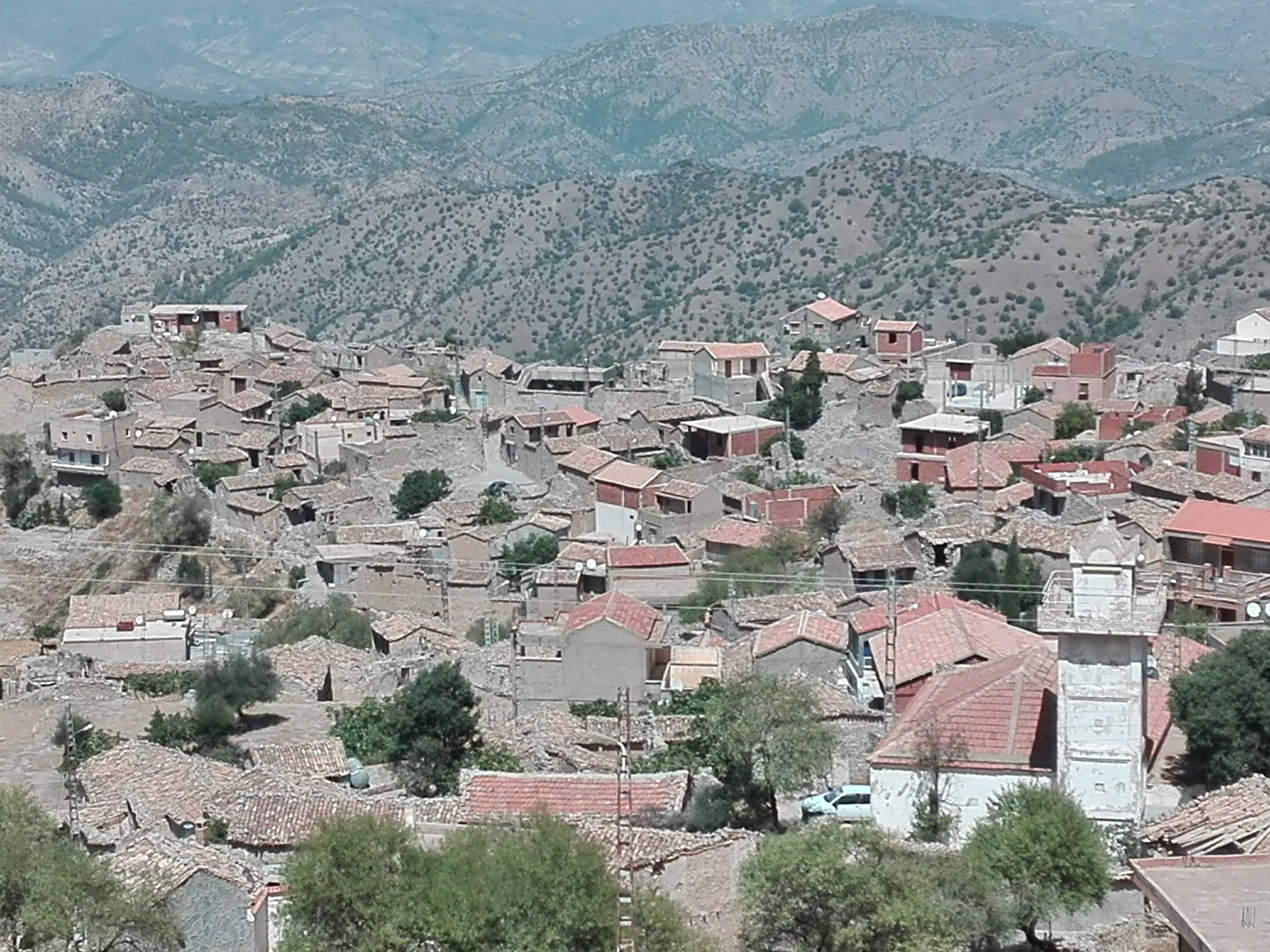
The Kalâa of Ait Abbas.

The Kalâa of the Aït Abbas (Kabyle: Lqelɛa n At Ɛebbas), sometimes spelled Qal'a or Guelaa (Kabyle: Lqelɛa), was a citadel and the capital of the Kingdom of Ait Abbas, which was founded in the sixteenth century in the Bibans and almost totally destroyed during the revolt of Cheikh Mokrani in 1871.

== Location ==
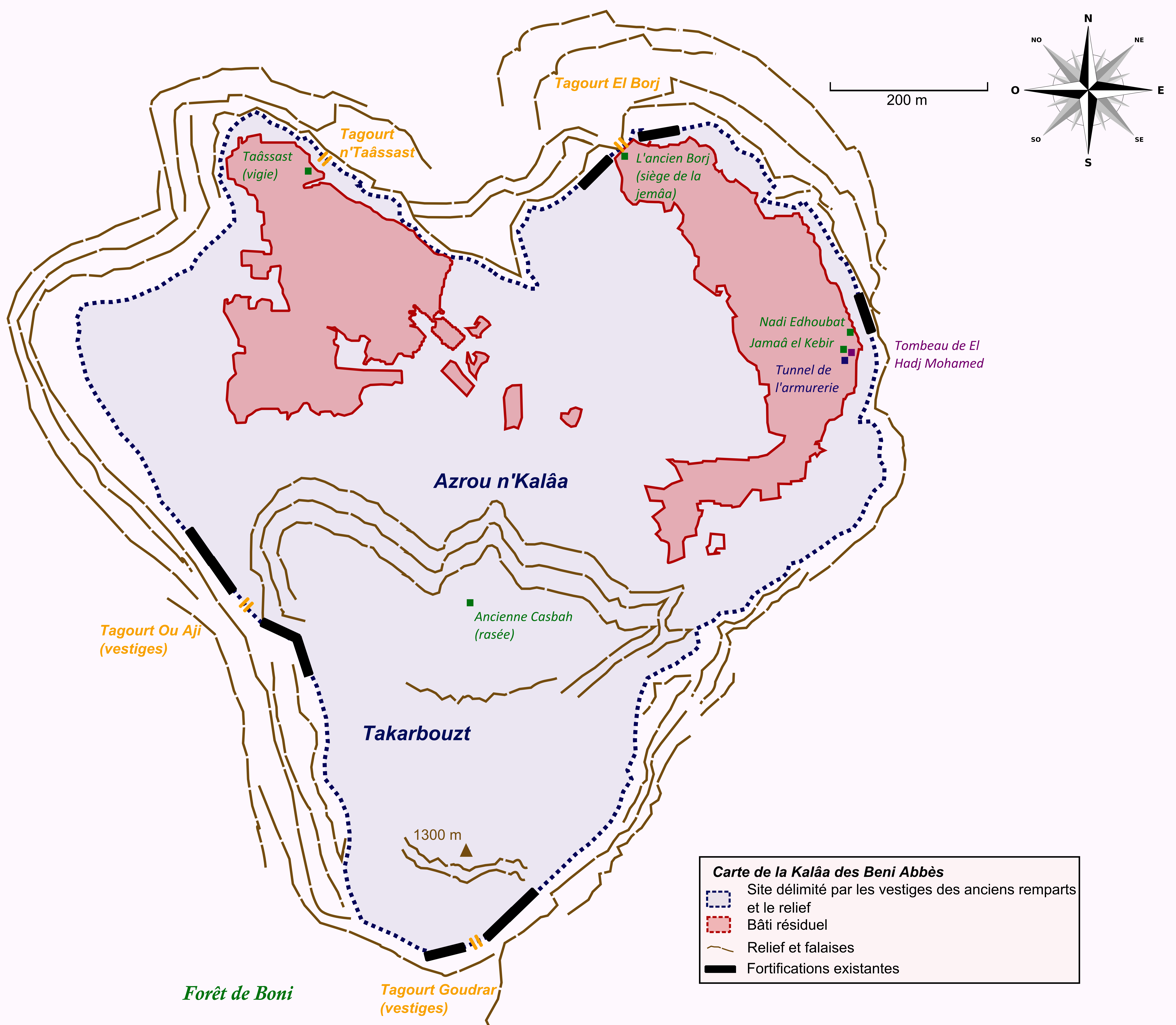
Site of the Kalâa of Aït Abbas.

The Kalâa of Aït Abbas is an important village of Kabylia in Algeria within the tribe of the same name : Aït Abbas. As evidenced by the many ruins, it was an ancient fortress and capital of the local kingdom from the sixteenth to the nineteenth century. It is part of the current Algerian commune of Ighil Ali (wilaya of Béjaïa). The site is located 11 km (6.8 mi) southeast of Ighil Ali, 7 km (4.3 mi) north of Teniet En Nasr, about 30 km (19 mi) northwest of Bordj Bou Arréridj and about 60 km (37 mi) southwest of Béjaïa.

The Kalâa, following the heart-shaped relief, is built on a rocky plateau with an area of 400 ha (990 acres) in the Biban range, at nearly 1,000 metres (3,300 ft) above sea level.

== History ==
The Kalâa of the Ait Abbas was the cradle and the heart of the powerful independent Berber Kingdom of Ait Abbas.

As the name Kalâa indicates, it is a citadel, protected by the cliffs that almost completely surround it, and also by its ramparts. The only automobile access ends at the entrance to the village. A rampart remains there that protected the ancient city, which, according to the Islamic encyclopedia, had a population of 80,000 in ancient times.

It was built in the same manner as the Beni Hammad Fort: strategic position, difficult access, guarded gates and surrounding wall.

The site of the Kalâa was a Hammadid fort housing a military contingent to control the strategic Iron Gate pass through the Bibans as well as the valley of the Soummam River and a stretch of the triq sultan.

Only ruins remain of the Hammadid fort, at a place named Akhriv Ouziri (ruins of Ziri). The Hammadid parade ground is located in front of the mosque and is now known as Loudha Lhali.

The foundry (1366–1871): French explorers and army officers noted large-caliber artillery pieces found at Kalâa between 1848 and 1865. Charles Féraud (translator officer) wrote in the Revue Africaine of the power of these cannons, given their volume and weight.

=== 19th century ===
According to Charles Farine, who visited the Kalâa in the 19th century, the city was divided into four quarters corresponding to four factions : the Ouled Hamadouch, the Ouled Yahya Ben Daoud, the Ouled Aïssa and the Ouled Chouarickh. The last quarter was already completely in ruins in the 19th century, from internal fighting within the city, and only three remained. At the time of his visit, the casbah (a separate military complex) built by Sultan Ahmed in the 16th century was also in ruins. The three quarters of the Kalâa were separated by walls because of the rivalries and armed conflicts between quarters. Each quarter had its own djemâa and amin (administrator).

The city held a special status. The Aït Abbas tribe did not belong to any of the soff (factions) that made it up; on the other it still furnished the city with fighters. Aït Abbas was considered more urban in its ways than other more rural villages in Kabylia.

== Bibliography ==
- Youssef Benoudjit, La Kalaa des Béni Abbès : au xvie siècle (The Kalâa of the Béni Abbès in the 16th century), Alger, Dahlab, 1997, 350 p. (ISBN 9961611322)
- Mahfoud Kaddache, Et l'Algérie se libéra (And Algeria Freed Itself), Alger, Paris-Méditerranée, 2003, 235 p. (ISBN 2842721799)
- Morizot, Jean (1985). Les Kabyles: Propos d'un témoin [The Kabyles: Tale of a Witness]. Publications du CHEAM. Paris: Centre des hautes études sur l'Afrique et l'Asie modernes. ISBN 2-903-18212-4.
- Farine, Charles (1865). À travers la Kabylie. Paris: Ducrocq.

== Sources ==
- Charles Farine, À travers la Kabylie (Across Kabylia), Paris, Ducrocq, 1865, 419 p.
- كتاب النسب للإمام العشماوي
- كتاب سلسلة الأصول لعبدالله بن حشلاف
- نبذة عن تاريخ قلعة بني عباس -الجمعية الثقافية-نادي المقراني
- Présentation on la Kalâa of the Beni Abbès (Algeria [archive]), Bibliothèque nationale de France.
- a, b et c Djamel Alilat, Commémoration de la mort de El Mokrani [archive], Liberté, 30 April 2006.
- Le Temps d'Algérie, 11 May 2009, p. 17
- a, b and c Djamel Alilat, Découverte d'un canon du xvie siècle : Béjaïa, Qalaâ des Beni Abbès
- El Watan, 21 April 2006. a et b Morizot 1985, p. 57
