= Ahmed III Ait Mokran =

Amokrane of the Ait Abbas from 1831 to 1853

- Amokrane, cheikh
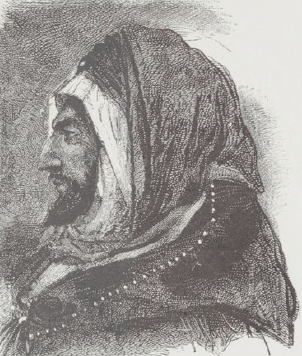
- Portrait of Ahmed III by Mont-Louis

Amokrane of the Ait Abbas
- Reign: 1831–1838/1853
- Predecessor: Ou Abdallah Amokrane
- Successor: Mohand Lhadj Amokrane

Cheikh of the Medjana
- Reign: 1831–1838/1853
- Predecessor: Ou Abdallah Amokrane
- Successor: Mohand Lhadj Amokrane (as a caliph)
- Died: 1853
- Issue: Mohand Lhadj; Boumezrag
- Dynasty: Ait Mokran
- Father: Mohand ou Lhadj
- Religion: Sufism
- Military career
- Conflicts: Constantine (1836); Constantine (1837)

Ahmed III (Kabyle: Ḥmed At Meqqran; died 1853) was an Amokrane of the Kingdom of Ait Abbas and Cheikh of the Medjana from 1831 to 1853. He was the last of the dynasty to hold the title of Cheikh of the Medjana as his son took the title of Caliph.

== Biography ==
Ahmed is the son of Mohand ou Lhadj and the father of Mohand Lhadj Amokrane and Boumezrag Ait Mokran.

His reign was contested as Abdesslam, his cousin, also claimed the throne.

In 1838, he is captured by Abdesslam then exiled himself to the Hodna. The same year, he is recognized as the caliph of the Medjana after allying to the bey of Constantine to defend the city in 1836 and 1837.

Later, he allied with France and recognized their authority on the Constantinois which allows French troops to cross the Iron Gates, during their expedition in October 1839 to counter the influence of Abdesslam, who was then allied with Emir Abdelkader.

In 1841, he triumphes on Abdesslam, allowing him to rebuild his fiefdom.

On 15 April 1845, a royal decree made his position as caliph a position of French civil servant. This takes away his control on the Ouled Nail tribes.

Later, he is suspected of complicity with Sherif Boubaghla who federated the Kabyle tribes against France.
