= Ali ben Aïssa =

Algerian commander (died 1860s)

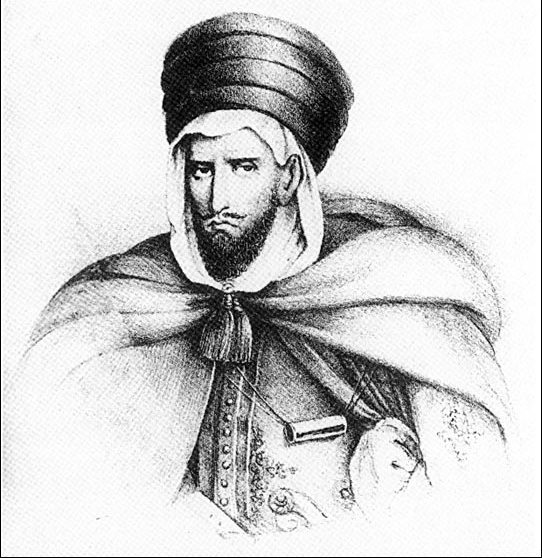
- Native name: علي بن عيسى
- Born: Aïssa Mahmed El Fergani; 18th century Beni Ferguén El-Milia, Deylik of Algiers
- Died: 1860s
- Allegiance: Deylik of Algiers; Beylik of Constantine
- Branch: Zwawas of the Bey of Constantine
- Rank: Khalifa
- Commands: Captain of Constantine
- Conflicts: French conquest of Algeria: Capture of Bône; Battle of Constantine; Siege of Constantine

Ali ben Aïssa, also known as Ali ben Aissa, or Aïssa Mahmed El Fergani (born sometime in the 18th century), was an Algerian commander, and one of the favorites of Ahmed Bey. He also served as Khaznadji, the most important position in the Beylik of Constantine behind the Bey. He was from the Beni Fergan tribe.
