= Ibrahim Bey =

Ibrahim Bey or İbrahim Bey may refer to:

- Bedreddin İbrahim I of Karaman (r. 1312–1333 and 1348–1349), Bey of the Beylik of Karaman
- Taceddin İbrahim II of Candar (r. 1440–1443), Bey of the Beylik of Candar
- İbrahim II of Karaman a.k.a. Damad II (?–1464), Bey of the Beylik of Karaman
- Ibrahim of the Ottoman Empire (1615-1648), Sultan of the Ottoman Empire
- Ibrahim Bey (Mamluk) (1735–1817), Mamluk chieftain in Egypt
- Ibrahim Pasha of Egypt (1789–1848), Egyptian general and ruler
- Ibrahim Bey (Constantine), Algerian ruler of Constantine, Algeria (1822-1824).
- Avraamy Aslanbegov a.k.a. Ibrahim bey Aslanbeyov (1822–1900), Azeri admiral and military author
- Ibrahim bey Usubov (1872–1920), Azeri general
- Cihangirzade İbrahim Bey (1874-1948), Turkish military officer and statesman
- İbrahim Çolak (officer) (1881-1944), Turkish military officer
- Kamel Ibrahim Bey, Egyptian Minister of Foreign Affairs from 1935 to 1936
