= List of beys of Constantine, Algeria =

Since the year 1528 CE, and under the Regency of Algiers, the Constantine Province (or Constantine beylik) in Algeria was governed by a Bey appointed by the dey of Algiers, until Constantine was taken by the French Royal Army on 13 October 1837. As for the other provinces of the Regency (the beylik of Oran and the beylik of the Titteri), the bey of Constantine was the representative of the dey of Algiers and administrated the provinces in his name.

From 1528 to 1830, the province of Constantine was governed by 44 beys, the first of whom was Ramdane-Tchulak bey who reigned on the province between 1528 and 1567. The last was Ahmed Bey whose reign started in 1826. This is the list of the beys and the year their mandate begun, annotated with important facts:

== Chronological list ==
Flag of Constantine beylek during the era of Ahmed Bey ben Mohamed Chérif

- Ramdane-Tchulak bey, 1528
- Djaâfer bey, 1567
- Mourad bey, 1637-was remembered for the revolt of Ahmed Sakheri
- Ferhat bey, 1648
- Mohammed bey ben Ferbat, 1652
- Redjem bey, 1667
- Kheïr ed-din bey, 1673
- Abdul-Rahman Dali bey, 1676
- Omar ben Abd-el Ramdan, 1679
- Châban bey, 1687
- Ali Khoudja bey, 1692
- Ahmed bey ben Ferhat, 1700
- Brahim bey, 1702
- Hamouda bey, 1709
- Ali bey ben Hamouda, 1708
- Hussein chaouch, 1709
- Abd-el Rahman bey, 1710
- Hosseïn Denguezli Bey, 1710
- Ali bey ben Salah, 1710
- Kelian Hussein bou Komia, 1713
- Hussein bey bou Hanak, 1746
- Hosseïn Bey (called "Zereg-Aïnou" meaning "the blue eyed"), 1753
- Ahmed Bey El-Kolli, 1756, died of illness
- Salah Bey, 1771–1792, born in 1725 in Smyrna in Ottoman Empire. Hassan Pasha, the dey of Algiers, ordered his assassination in 1792.
- Hussein Bey ben Bousnek, 1 September 1791, son of Hassan Pasha Bousnek, assassinated.
- El Asrak Aïno, 1791
- Moustapha ben Sliman El-Ouznadji, February 1795 – January 1798, assassinated.
- Hadj-Mustapha-Ingliz (called "the British"), January 1798 – 1803 exiled to Tunis
- Osman Ben Koulougli, 1803, Killed facing Kabyles rebels
- Abdallah Bey, 1804, Assassinated.
- Hussein bey ben Salah, 1806, son of Salah bey the Turk. Assassinated as was his father.
- Ali bey ben Youssef, August 1807. Assassinated.
- Bey-Rouhou, ruled a fortnight. Assassinated.
- Ahmed bey Tobbal, 1808–1811. Assassinated.
- Mohammed Nàman bey, 1811–1814. Assassinated.
- Mohammed Chakar bey, 1814–1818. Assassinated.

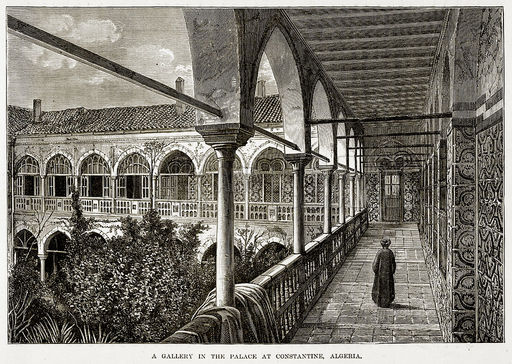
The Beys Palace in Constantine, is named after Ahmed Bey the last bey of Constantine

- Kara Mustapha, 1818–1818, 33 days of reign. Assassinated.
- Ahmed Bey El Mamelouk, 1818–1818, reigned for a month; he was named bey once again later.
- Braham bey Charbi, 1 year of reign. Assassinated.
- Mohammed bey Mili, 1818–1819, surnamed bou chetabia (the Machete man). 2 years of reign. Exiled to Algiers.
- Ahmed bey El Mamelouk, 1820–1822. Exiled to Miliana, where he was assassinated.
- Ibrahim Bey, 1822–1824, Exiled to Médéa, Assassinated in 1832 on the orders of Ahmed Bey.
- Mohammed bey Malamli, 1824–1826, or Manamani. Ruled two years. Exiled to Algiers.
- Ahmed Bey, 1826-15 December 1837. Declared dethroned by the French Empire the December 15th, 1830, for non-submission.

== See also ==
- List of Pashas and Deys of Algiers
- Algeria
  - Heads of state of Algeria
  - Heads of government of Algeria
  - Colonial heads of Algeria
- Lists of office-holders
