= French conquest of Algeria =

Conquest of Algeria by France, 1830–1903

- Part of the French colonization of Africa
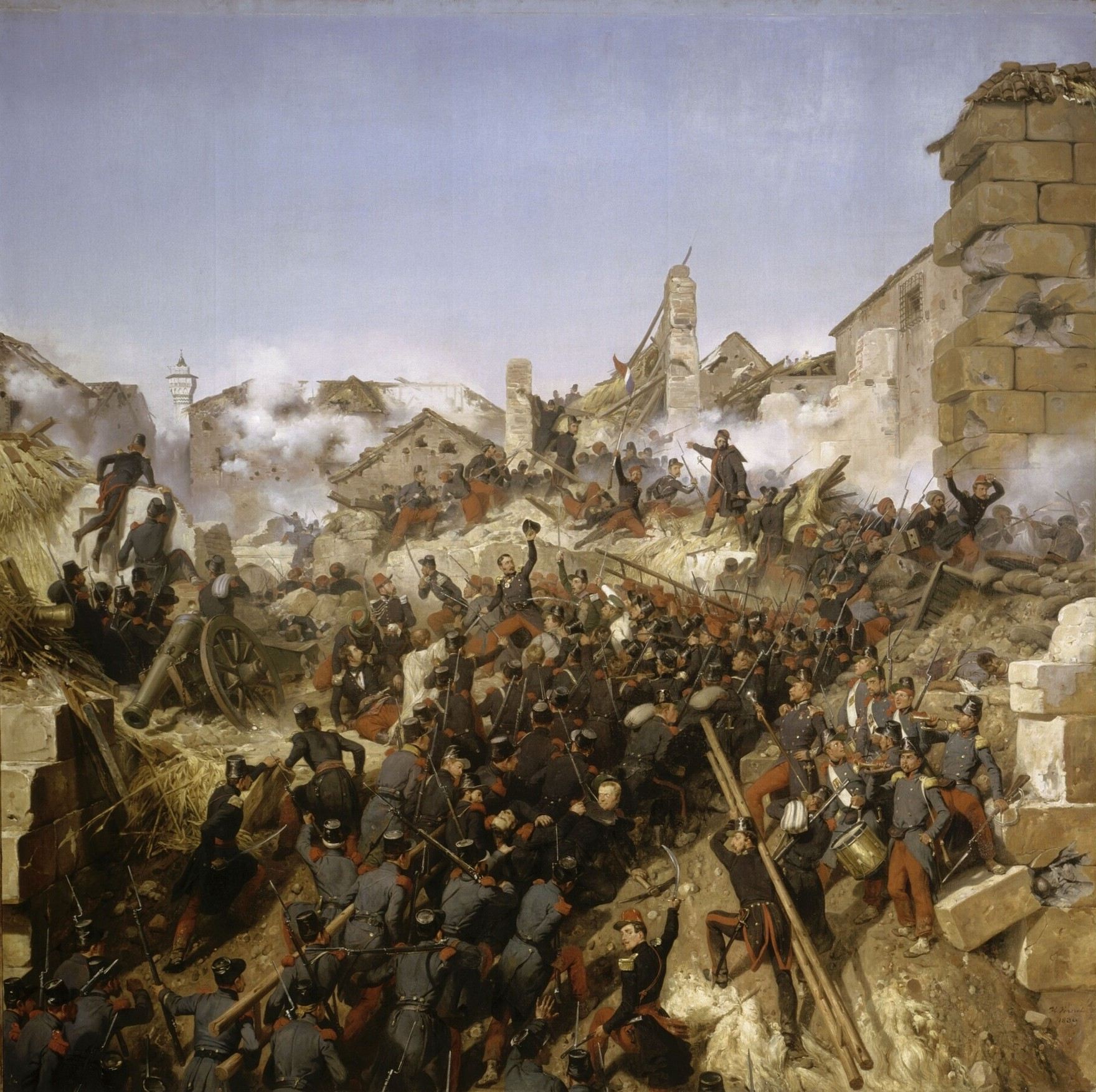
- The Siege of Constantine by Horace Vernet, 1838
Date	1830–1903 (73 years); Main phase: 1830–1847 (17 years)
Location	Algeria
Result	French victory: Pacification of Algeria

Belligerents
Kingdom of France (Bourbon) (until July 1830) Kingdom of France (Orléans) (1830–1848) Support: Morocco (1847)	Regency of Algiers; Titteri; Oran; Beylik of Constantine; Emirate of Mascara; Kingdom of Aït Abbas; Awlad Sidi Shaykh; Kel Ahaggar; Support: Morocco (until 1844)

Commanders and leaders
Charles X (France) Louis Philippe I (France) Napoleon III; Louis-Auguste-Victor (France) Sylvain Charles Valée (France) Charles-Marie Denys † (France) Aimable Pélissier	Hussein Dey; Ahmed Bey; Emir Abdelkader; Dély Ibrahim; Ben-Zaamoum; Ali ben Aïssa; Ahmed bin Salem

Strength
Invasion force: 34,000 troops, 83 guns; 100 warships; 11 ships-of-the-line; 572 merchantmen Ultimately: 160,000 troops	Unknown

Casualties and losses
117,630–200,000 military losses (including 7,469 troops KIA between 1830 and 1875); Over 480,000 dead (1830–1862; mostly civilians from disease)	500,000–1,000,000 dead (1830–1862; mostly civilians)

The French conquest of Algeria (French: Conquête de l'Algérie par la France; Arabic: الغزو الفرنسي للجزائر) took place between 1830 and 1903. In 1827, an argument between Hussein Dey, the ruler of the Regency of Algiers, and the French consul escalated into a naval blockade, following which the Kingdom of France invaded Algiers in 1830, and seized other coastal communities. Amid internal political strife in France, decisions were repeatedly taken to retain control of the territory, and additional military forces were brought in over the following years to quell resistance in the interior of the country. Although the conquest of Algeria largely ended by 1847, shortly before its formal annexation by France, it was not until 1903 that France fully secured its colonial borders, incorporating the Saharan south.

Initially, the Algerian resistance was mainly divided between forces under Ahmed Bey at Constantine, seeking to reinstate the Regency of Algiers, primarily in the east, and nationalist forces in the west and center. Treaties with the nationalists under Emir Abdelkader enabled the French to first focus on the elimination of the remnants of the Deylik, achieved with the 1837 siege of Constantine. Abdelkader continued to wage stiff resistance in the west. Finally driven into Morocco in 1842, by large-scale and heavy-handed French military action, he continued to wage a guerrilla war until the Moroccan government, under French diplomatic pressure following its defeat in the Franco-Moroccan War, attacked him and drove him out of Morocco. He surrendered to French forces in 1847. Various governments and scholars have considered France's conquest of Algeria as constituting a genocide.

== Background ==
The Beyliks (provinces) of Algiers. The Dar-es-Soltan was the part directly controlled by the Dey.

The coastal and mountainous parts of Algeria were controlled by the Regency of Algiers. The Regency (or Deylik), while nominally part of the Ottoman Empire, acted independently from the Ottoman Sultan. The dey ruled the entire Regency, but only exercised direct control in and around Algiers, with Beyliks (Governorates) established in the Western, Central, and Eastern parts of the country. The remainder of the territory (including much of the interior), while nominally ruled by Algiers, was effectively under the control of local Berber and Arab leaders, who usually acted as vassals to Dey, albeit not always. In the northern Saharan parts some oasis kingdoms such as the Sultanate of Tuggurt were controlled by the Regency. The inner Saharan parts were only claimed by the Dey, while in reality they were completely controlled by tribal confederacies, and smaller kingdoms such as that of Kel Ahaggar. The Dey was supported, or in some cases controlled by the Janissaries of the Odjak of Algiers, although their power was heavily limited after 1817. The territory was bordered to the west by the Sultanate of Morocco and to the east by the Beylik of Tunis. The western border, the Tafna River, was particularly porous since there were shared tribal connections that crossed it.

The Regency of Algiers was one of the main bases of the Barbary pirates and Barbary Slave Traders who attacked Christian ships and coastal settlements in the Mediterranean and, in rare cases, the North Atlantic, made possible by European ships. Like the rest of the Barbary Coast, the Regency of Algiers lived from the trade of slaves or goods captured from European and American merchant shipping in the Mediterranean. The European powers bombarded Algiers on different occasions in retaliation and the United States initiated the Barbary Wars in order to put an end to Algerian privateering against Christian shipping.

The conquest of Algeria began in the last days of the Bourbon Restoration by Charles X of France. It aimed to put a definite end to Barbary privateering and increase the king's popularity among the French people, particularly in Paris, where many veterans of the Napoleonic Wars lived. Algerian slave trade and piracy immediately ceased after the French conquered Algiers.

=== Fan Affair ===
In 1795–96, the French Republic contracted to purchase wheat for the French army from two Jewish merchants in Algiers. The merchants, who had debts to Hussein Dey, the Dey of Algiers, claimed inability to pay those debts until France paid its debts to them. The dey unsuccessfully negotiated with Pierre Deval, the French consul, to rectify this situation, and suspected Deval of collaborating with the merchants against him, especially since the French government made no provision to pay the merchants in 1820. Deval's nephew Alexandre, the consul in Bône, further angered the dey by fortifying French storehouses in Bône and La Calle despite prior agreements. While the unpaid debts are attributed as the primary cause of the Fan Affair, David Todd argues in A Velvet Empire: French Informal Imperialism in the Nineteenth Century that the substantive cause of the altercation was the French attempts to fortify a previously disused warehouse at La Calle, in an attempt to turn La Calle and the local region into a colonial outpost for the French, and that the dey's discussion of the debts arose as a secondary concern.

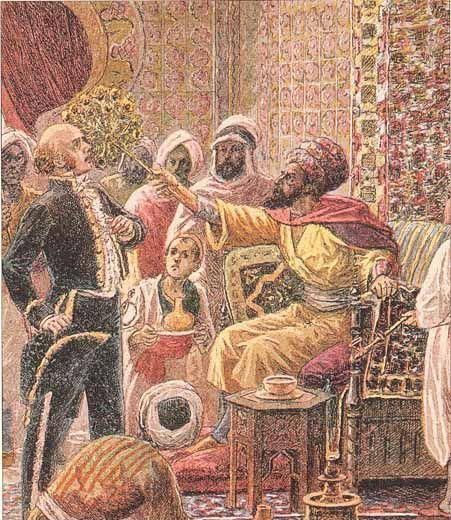
The "Fan Affair", which escalated into the invasion.

After a contentious meeting on 29 April 1827 in which Deval refused to provide satisfactory answers, the dey struck Deval with his fly-whisk (then called a fan). Charles X used this slight against his diplomatic representative to first demand an apology from the dey, and then to initiate a blockade against the port of Algiers. The French blockade of Algiers lasted for three years, and was primarily to the detriment of French merchants who were unable to do business with Algiers, while Barbary pirates were still able to evade the blockade. When France in 1829 sent an ambassador to the dey with a proposal for negotiations, he responded with cannon fire directed toward one of the blockading ships. The French then decided that more forceful action was required.

Following the failure of the ambassador's visit, Charles appointed as prime minister Jules, Prince de Polignac, a hardline conservative. This outraged the liberal French opposition, which then had a majority in the Chamber of Deputies. Polignac opened negotiations with Muhammad Ali of Egypt to essentially divide up North Africa. Ali, although nominally a vassal of the Ottomans, eventually rejected this idea. As popular opinion continued to rise against Polignac and the King, they decided that a foreign policy victory such as the capture of Algiers would turn opinion in their favour again.

== Invasion of Algiers ==
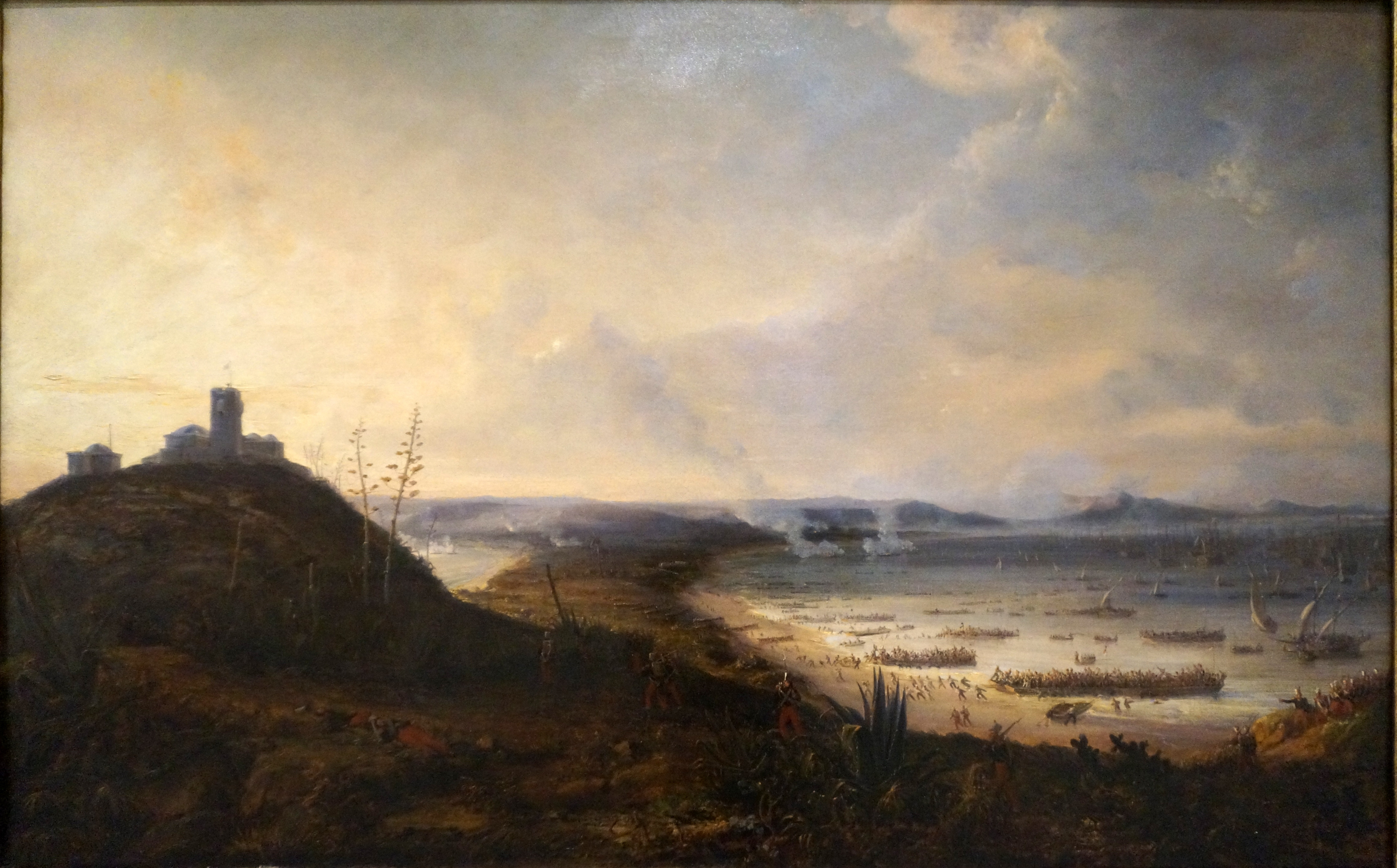
At Sidi-Ferruch by Pierre-Julien Gilbert.

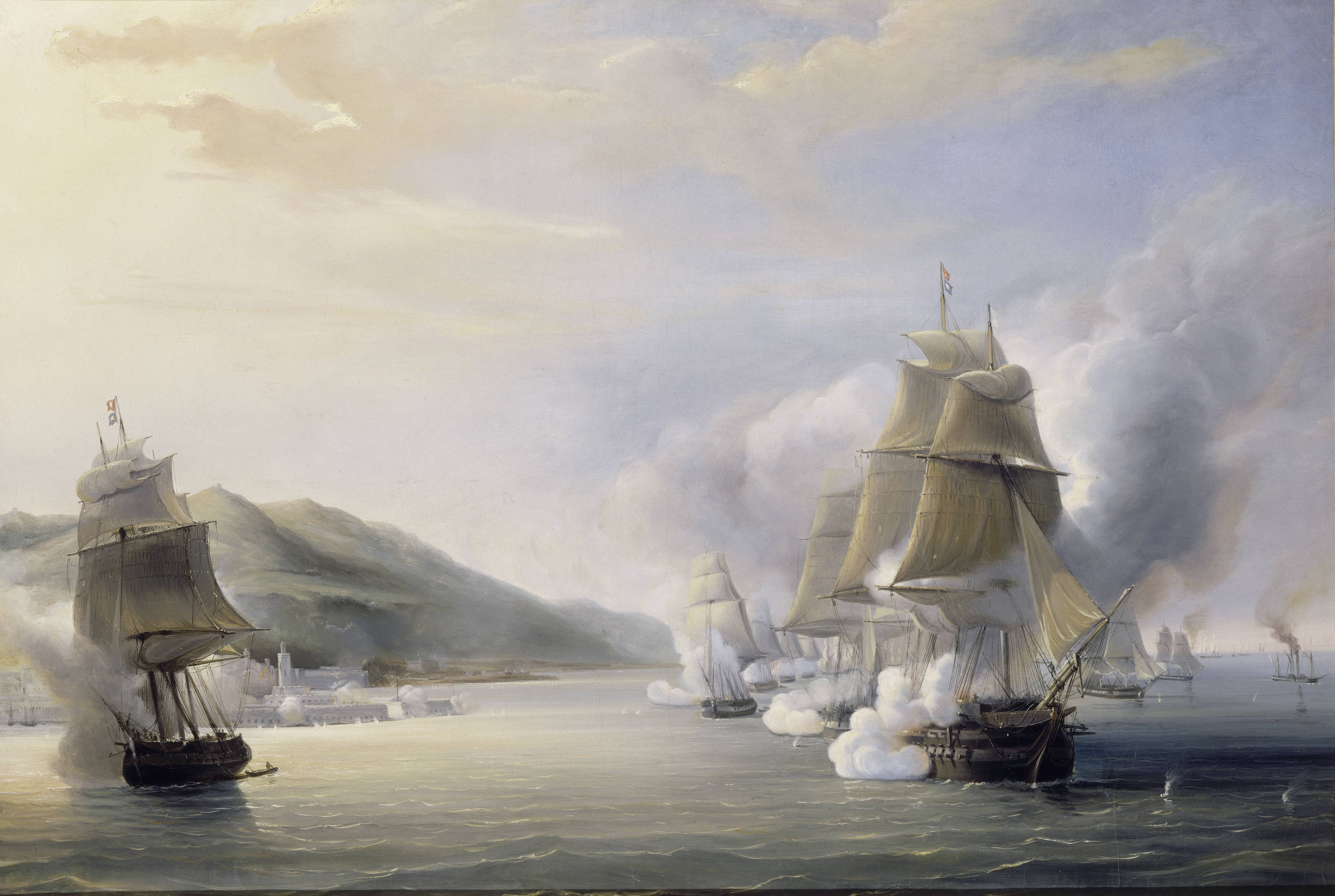
The attack of Admiral Duperré during the taking of Algiers in 1830.

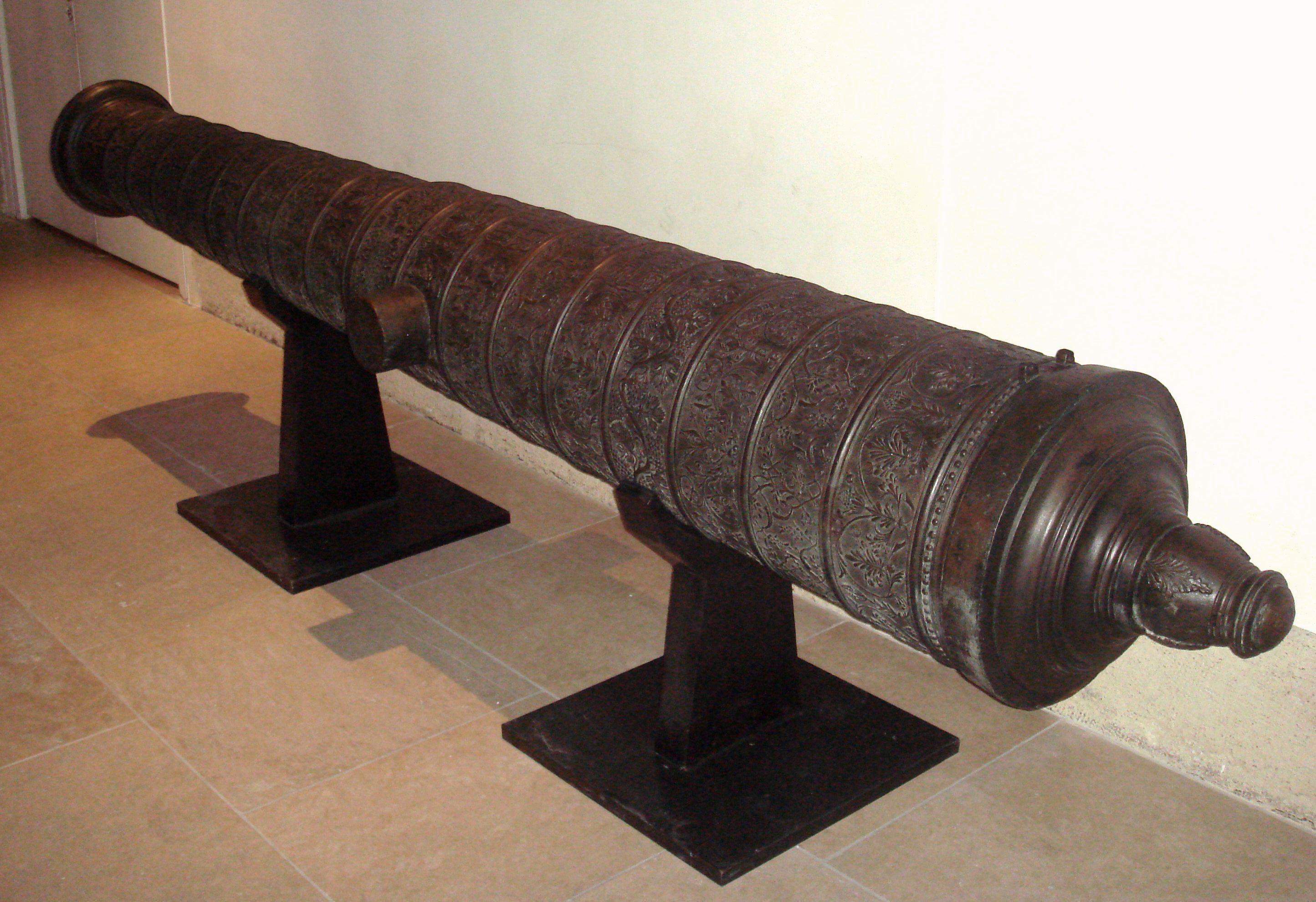
Ornate Ottoman cannon, length: 385cm, cal:178mm, weight: 2910, stone projectile, founded 8 October 1581 in Algiers, seized by France at Algiers in 1830. Musée de l'Armée, Paris.

Admiral Duperré took command in Toulon of an armada of 635 ships and then headed for Algiers. Following a plan for the invasion of Algeria originally developed by Major Boutin under Napoleon in 1808, General de Bourmont then landed 34,000 soldiers 27 kilometres (17 mi) west of Algiers, at Sidi Ferruch, on 14 June 1830. To face the French, the dey sent 7,000 janissaries, 19,000 troops from the beys of Constantine and Oran, and about 17,000 Kabyles. The French established a strong beachhead and pushed toward Algiers, thanks in part to superior artillery and better organization. On 19 June the French defeated the dey's army at the battle of Staouéli, and entered Algiers on 5 July after a three-week campaign. The dey accepted capitulation in exchange for his freedom and the offer to retain possession of his personal wealth. Five days later, he went into exile in Naples with his family. The Turkish Janissaries also quit the territory, leaving for Turkey. The dey's departure ended 313 years of Ottoman rule of the territory.

While the French command had nominally agreed to preserve the liberties, properties, and religious freedoms of the inhabitants, French troops immediately began plundering the city, arresting and killing people for arbitrary reasons, seizing property, and desecrating religious sites. By mid-August, the last remnants of Turkish authority were summarily deported without opportunity to liquidate significant assets. One estimate indicates that more than fifty million francs in assets were diverted into private hands during the plunder. This activity had a profound effect on future relations between the French occupiers and the natives. In 1833 a French commission wrote that "we have sent to their deaths on simple suspicion and without trial people whose guilt was always doubtful ... we massacred people carrying safe conducts ... we have outdone in barbarity the barbarians". The expulsion of the Turks created a power vacuum in significant parts of the territory, from which resistance to French occupation immediately arose.

The news of the capture of Algiers had hardly reached Paris when Charles X was deposed during the Three Glorious Days of July 1830, and his cousin Louis-Philippe, the "citizen king", was named to preside over a constitutional monarchy. The new government, composed of liberal opponents of the Algiers expedition, was reluctant to pursue the invasion begun by the old regime. However, the victory was enormously popular, and the new government of Louis-Philippe only withdrew a portion of the invasion force. General Bourmont, who had sent troops to occupy Bône and Oran, withdrew them from those places with the idea of returning to France to restore Charles to the throne. When it was clear that his troops were not supportive of this effort, he resigned and went into exile in Spain. Louis-Philippe replaced him with Bertrand Clauzel in September 1830.

The bey of Titteri, who had participated in the battle at Staouéli, attempted to coordinate resistance against the French with the beys of Oran and Constantine, but they were unable to agree on leadership. Clauzel in November led a French column of 8,000 to Médéa, Titteri's capital, losing 200 men in skirmishes. After leaving 500 men at Blida he occupied Médéa without resistance, as the bey had retreated.

== Further expansion ==
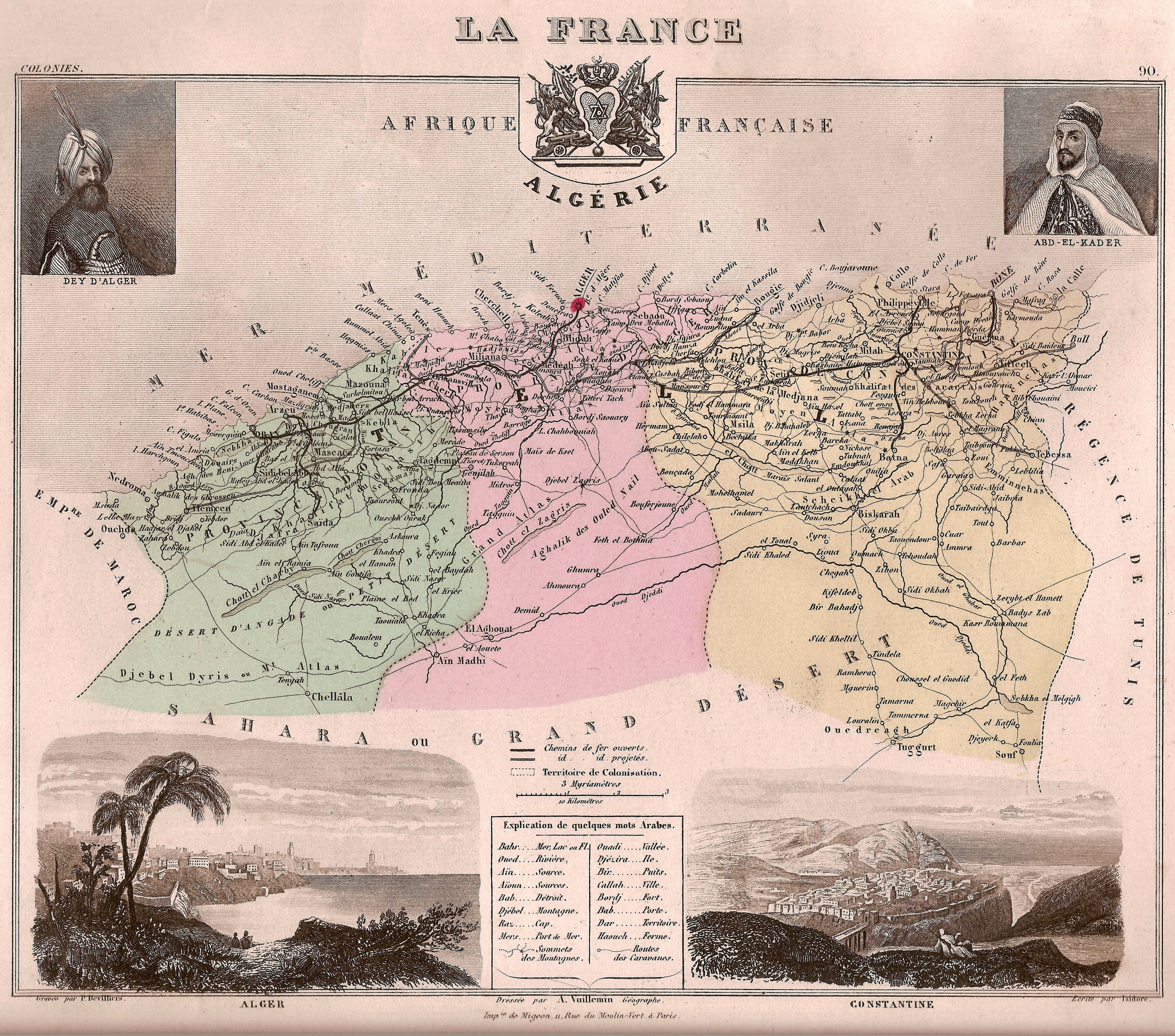
1877 map of the three French departments of Alger, Oran and Constantine

Chronological map of the French conquest.

Clauzel introduced a formal civil administration in Algiers, and began recruiting zouaves, or native auxiliaries to the French forces, with the goal of establishing a proper colonial presence. He and others formed a company to acquire agricultural land and to subsidize its settlement by European farmers, triggering a land rush. Clauzel recognized the farming potential of the Mitidja Plain and envisioned the production there of cotton on a large scale. During his second term as governor general (1835–36), he used his office to make private investments in land and encouraged army officers and bureaucrats in his administration to do the same. This development created a vested interest among government officials in greater French involvement in Algeria. Commercial interests with influence in the government also began to recognize the prospects for profitable land speculation in expanding the French zone of occupation. Over a ten-year period they created large agricultural tracts, built factories and businesses, and bought cheap local labor.

Clauzel also attempted to extend French influence into Oran and Constantine by negotiating with the bey of Tunis to supply "local" rulers that would operate under French administration. The bey refused, seeing the obvious conflicts inherent in the idea. The French foreign ministry objected to negotiations Clauzel conducted with Morocco over the establishment of a Moroccan bey in Oran, and in early 1831 replaced him with Baron Berthezène.

Berthezène was a weak administrator opposed to colonisation. His worst military failure came when he was called to support the bey at Médéa, whose support for the French and corruption had turned the population there against him. Berthezène led troops to Médéa in June 1831 to extract the bey and the French garrison. On their way back to Algiers they were continually harassed by Kabyle resistance, and driven into a panicked retreat that Berthezène failed to control. French casualties during this retreat were significant (nearly 300), and the victory fanned the flames of resistance, leading to attacks on colonial settlements. The growing colonial financial interests began insisting on a stronger hand, which Louis-Philippe provided in Savary, Duke Rovigo at the end of 1831.

Rovigo regained control of Bône and Bougie (present-day Béjaïa), cities that Clauzel had taken and then lost due to resistance by the Kabyle people. He continued policies of colonisation of the land and expropriation of properties. His suppression of resistance in Algiers was brutal, with the military presence extended into its neighborhoods. He was recalled in 1833 due to the overtly violent nature of the repression, and replaced by Baron Voirol. Voirol established French occupation in Oran, and another French general, Louis Alexis Desmichels, was given an independent command that gained control over Arzew and Mostaganem.

On 22 June 1834, France formally annexed the occupied areas of Algeria, which had an estimated Muslim population of about two million, as a military colony. The colony was run by a military governor who had both civilian and military authority, including the power of executive decree. His authority was nominally over an area of "limited occupation" near the coast, but the realities of French colonial expansion beyond those areas ensured continued resistance from the local population. The policy of limited occupation was formally abandoned in 1840 for one of complete control. Voirol was replaced in 1834 by Jean-Baptiste Drouet, Comte d'Erlon, who became the first governor of the colony, and who was given the task of dealing with the rising threat of `Abd al-Qādir and continuing French failures to subdue Ahmed Bey, Constantine's ruler.

== Minor Algerian resistances (1830s) ==
=== Blida ===
In the First Battle of Blida, the Berber-Algerian forces led by Mohamed Ben Zaamoum defeated the French army with minimal casualties. The French forces were strategically ambushed by the Algerians, who welcomed them at first, and attacked them from the mountain in a sudden and vigorous manner soon after.

In the Second Battle of Blida, through ambushes, Algerian forces effected a French retreat. Both battles were fought in 1830 and France was only able to capture Blida in 1839.

=== Béjaïa ===
Béjaia experienced constant conflicts with the French until its capture. After the fall of the Dey, the tribes of Mézzaïa took over the city. In 1831 they defeated a minor French expedition against them. Nevertheless, in 1833 France captured the city with minimal losses, from Kabyle and Kouloughli forces. The Algerian Kabyles tried to recapture the city in 1835, but failed against the better equipped French defenders.

=== Mitidja ===
In 1834 the French, under the lead of Maximilien Joseph Schauenburg, attacked the city of Hadjout. The resistance used guerilla tactics, but was crushed by August 1835. On 23 February 1837, the French continued their campaign against the Algerian resistance in the Mitidja plains. On 24 February, the French met Algerian resistance on the Mitidja plains, and pushed towards the city of Larbaa, which, at the time, was still under the rule of Algerian tribes. The city was captured two days later.

=== Zwawas ===
On 8 May 1837, the Kabyles from the regions of the Col des Beni Aïcha, the Issers and Amraoua raided the Mercier farm of Reghaïa under French rule. This motivated the French to start an attack against the Zwawa Kabyles, and the Kabyles of Isser. On the 17 May the French pushed back the Zwawas from Thénia. Meanwhile, the French were ambushed by the tribes of Isser and Amraoua, but they were quickly repelled. On 18 and 19 May the French 2nd Light Infantry division defeated a few hundred Algerian defenders at Béni Aïcha. The French lost three soldiers, while the Algerians lost 18. On the same day, a few hundred Kabyles tried to ambush the French army, but were easily defeated, suffering considerable losses.

== Rise of Abdelkader ==
Emir Abdelkader was born Abdelkader Ibn Muhieddine Ibn Mostapha Ibn Mohamed Ibn Mokhtar El-Hasani El-Djezairi (Arabic: عبد القادر ابن محيي الدين ابن مصطفى ابن محمد ابن المختار الحساني الجزائري) in May 1807, in the Algerian province of Oran. As the son of a religious figure and Marabout, Abdelkader was born into a wealthy and religious family and thus he himself also enjoyed various forms of education. He was schooled in Islamic sciences, Quran, and Greek and Arabian treatises on ancient and modern history, philosophy, philology, astronomy, geography, and medicine. At the age of 14, Abdelkader attained the title of Hafiz, and was active in the family mosque where he explained passages of the Quran. At age 18, in 1825, Abdelkader and his father performed the Hajj. After fulfilling their pilgrimage to Mecca, they travelled to Damascus, where they studied for a few months. After this stay, they made another pilgrimage to Baghdad. Before heading home in 1828, they performed the Hajj one more time.

Muhieddine, the father of Abdelkader and the superior of a religious brotherhood, who had spent time in the Dey's jails for opposing the Dey's rule, launched attacks against the French and their makhzen allies at Oran in 1832. In the same year, tribal elders in the territories near Mascara chose Muhieddine's son, 25-year-old Abdelkader, to take his place leading the jihad. Then member of parliament Alexis de Tocqueville described Abdelkader's rise to power in his 1837 Letter on Algeria as follows:

To the west of the province of Algiers, near the borders of the Moroccan empire, there has long been established a very famous family of marabouts. They descend from Mohammed himself, and their name is venerated throughout the Regency. At the time the French took possession of the country, the head of this family was an old man called Mahiddin. To the illustration of birth, Mahiddin added the advantage of having been to Mecca and of having long and energetically opposed the exactions of the Turks. His sanctity was in great honour and his skill well known. When the surrounding tribes began to feel the unbearable discomfort caused to men by the absence of power, they came to Mahiddin and proposed that he take over their affairs. The old man gathered them all together on a large plain; there he told them that at his age they should be concerned with heaven and not with earth, that he refused their offer, but that he begged them to defer their vote to one of his younger sons, whom he showed them. He enumerated at length the titles of this one to govern his countrymen: his early piety, his pilgrimage to the Holy Places, his descent from the Prophet; he made known several striking clues which heaven had used to designate him in the midst of his brothers, and he proved that all the ancient prophecies which announced a liberator to the Arabs evidently applied to him. The tribes proclaimed by common agreement the son of Mahiddin emir-el-mouminin, that is to say, leader of the believers.

This young man, who was then only twenty-five years old and of poor appearance, was named Abd-el-Kader.

Abdelkader, who was recognized as Amir al-Muminin (commander of the faithful), quickly gained the support of tribes in the western territories. In 1834 he concluded a treaty with General Desmichels, who was then military commander of the province of Oran. In the treaty, which was reluctantly accepted by the French administration, France recognized Abdelkader as the sovereign of territories in Oran province not under French control, and authorized Abdelkader to send consuls to French-held cities. The treaty did not require Abdelkader to recognize French rule, something glossed over in its French text. Abdelkader used the peace provided by this treaty to widen his influence with tribes throughout western and central Algeria.

While d'Erlon was apparently unaware of the danger posed by Abdelkader's activities, General Camille Alphonse Trézel, then in command at Oran, did see it, and attempted to separate some of the tribes from Abdelkader. When he succeeded in convincing two tribes near Oran to acknowledge French supremacy, Abdelkader dispatched troops to move those tribes to the interior, away from French influence. Trézel countered by marching a column of troops out from Oran to protect the territory of those tribes on 16 June 1835. After exchanging threats, Abdelkader withdrew his consul from Oran and ejected the French consul from Mascara, a de facto declaration of war. The two forces clashed in a bloody but inconclusive engagement near the Sig River. However, when the French, who were short on provisions, began withdrawing toward Arzew, Abdelkader led 20,000 men against the beleaguered column, and in the Battle of Macta routed the force, killing 500 men. The debacle led to the recall of Comte d'Erlon.

General Clausel was appointed a second time to replace d'Erlon. He led an attack against Mascara in December of that year, which Abdelkader, with advance warning, had evacuated. In January 1836 Clausel occupied Tlemcen, and established a garrison there before return to Algiers to plan an attack against Constantine. Abdelkader continued to harry the French at Tlemcen, so additional troops under Thomas Robert Bugeaud, a veteran of the Napoleonic Wars who was experienced in irregular warfare, were sent from Oran to secure control up to the Tafna River and to resupply the garrison. Abdelkader retreated before Bugeaud, but decided to make a stand on the banks of the Sikkak River. On July 6, 1836, Bugeaud decisively defeated Abdelkader in the Battle of Sikkak, losing less than fifty men to more than 1,000 casualties suffered by Abdelkader. The battle was one of the few formal battles Abdelkader engaged in; after this defeat he restricted his actions as much as possible to guerrilla-style attacks.

== Constantine ==
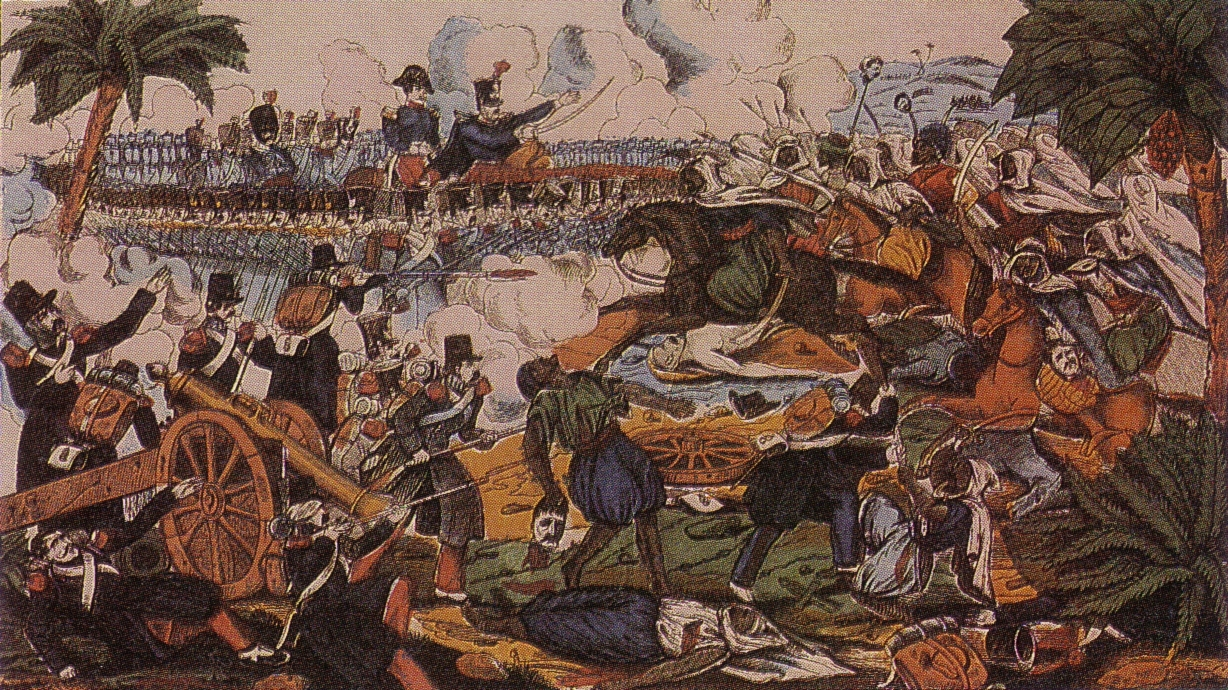
Battle of Constantine in November 1836

Ahmed Bey had continuously resisted any attempts by the French or others to subjugate Constantine, and continued to play a role in resistance against French rule, in part because he hoped to eventually become the next Dey. Clausel and Ahmed had tangled diplomatically over Ahmed's refusal to recognize French authority over Bône, which he considered to still be Algerian territory, and Clausel decided to move against him. In November 1836 Clausel led 8,700 men into the Constantine beylik, but was repulsed in the Battle of Constantine; the failure led to Clausel's recall. He was replaced by the Comte de Damrémont, who led an expedition which captured Constantine the following year, although he was killed during the siege and replaced by Sylvain Charles, comte Valée.

== Abd Al-Qādir's resistance renewed ==
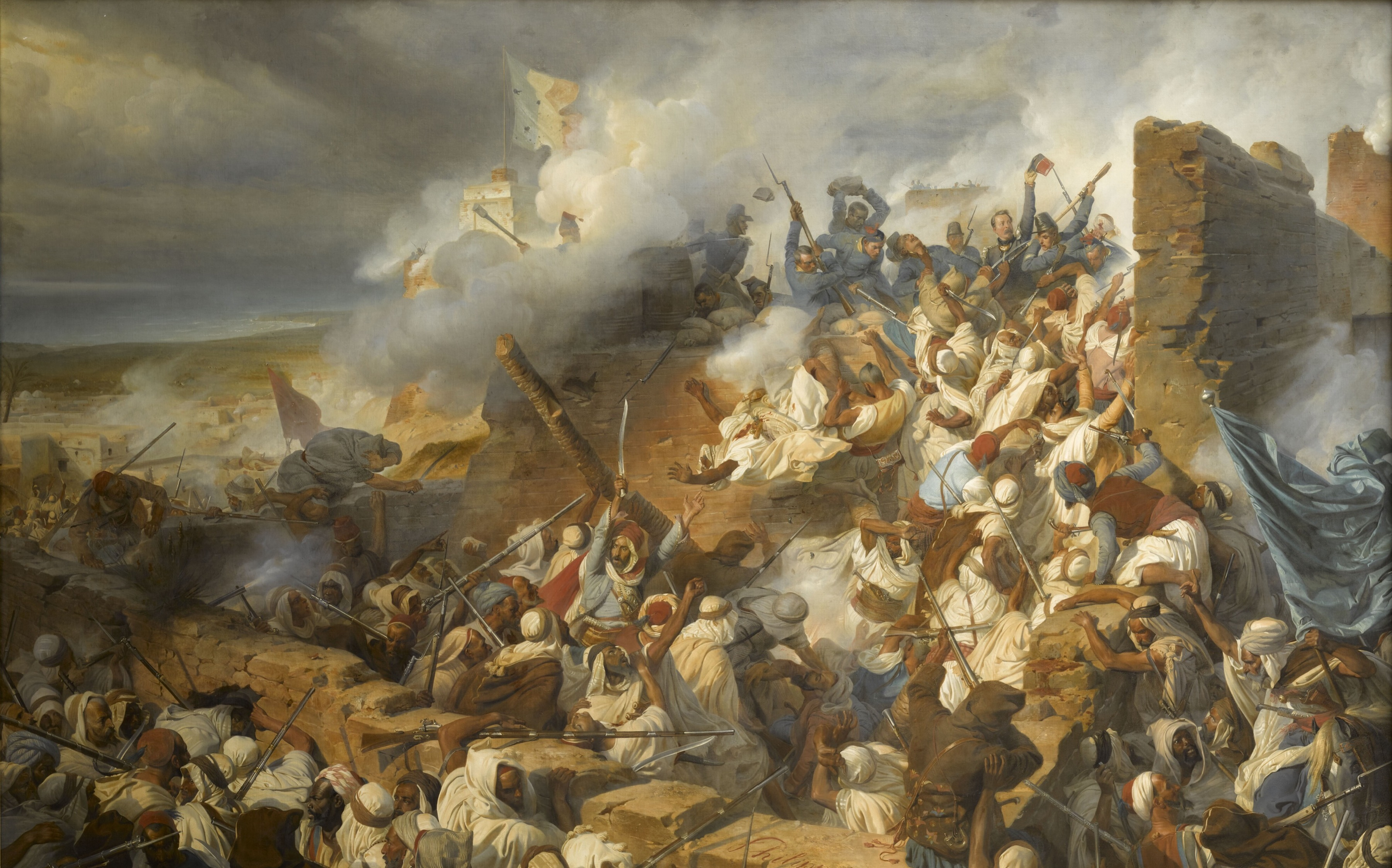
The Defence of Mazagran by Henri Félix Emmanuel Philippoteaux, 1841

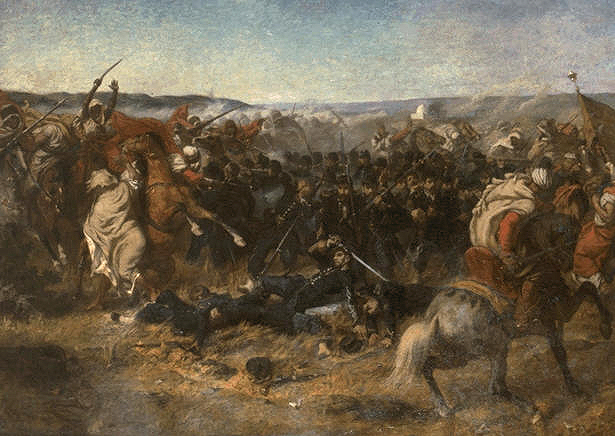
Battle of Sidi Brahim in 1845

In May 1837, General Thomas Robert Bugeaud, then in command of Oran, negotiated the Treaty of Tafna with Abd al-Qādir, in which he effectively recognized Abd al-Qādir's control over much of the interior of what is now Algeria. Abd Al-Qādir used the treaty to consolidate his power over tribes throughout the interior, establishing new cities far from French control. He worked to motivate the population under French control to resist by peaceful and military means. Rivalries between clans and brotherhoods that had divided Algeria prior to the French invasion were resolved under his organization, wherein he divided controlled territory into districts, each one reinforced and in control of its own defense. Seeking to again face the French, he laid claim under the treaty to territory that included the main route between Algiers and Constantine. When French troops contested this claim in late 1839 by marching through a mountain defile known as the Iron Gates, Abd al-Qādir claimed a breach of the treaty, and renewed calls for jihad. In 1839 he launched the Mitidja Campaign led by the Kabyle commander Ahmed bin Salem, and the Arab Mohammed ben Allel. The campaign was a success, albeit the Algerian forces were routed in the battle of Oued El Alleug. Throughout 1840 he waged guerrilla war against the French in the provinces of Algiers and Oran. Valée's failures to end the war led to his replacement in December 1840 by General Bugeaud.

Bugeaud instituted a strategy of scorched earth, combined with fast-moving cavalry columns not unlike those used by Abd al-Qādir to progressively take territory from Abd al-Qādir. The troops' tactics were heavy-handed, and the population suffered significantly. Abd Al-Qādir was eventually forced to establish a mobile headquarters that was known as a smala or zmelah. In 1843 French forces raided this camp while he was away from it, capturing more than 5,000 fighters and Abd al-Qādir's warchest.

Abd Al-Qādir was forced to retreat into Morocco, from which he had been receiving some support, especially from tribes in the border areas. When French diplomatic efforts to convince Morocco to expel Abd al-Qādir failed, the French resorted to military means with the First Franco-Moroccan War in 1844 to compel the sultan to change his policy.

France launched a campaign in 1845 in the Kabylia region in hopes of destroying Abdelkader's local forces led by the aforementioned Ahmed bin Salem. The Kabyle Zwawa forces had been a nuisance for France since 1837, and launched several ambushes such as the Battle of Beni Mered, thus it was imperative to destroy Abdelkader's forces in the region. After successfully routing Ahmed in the Battle of Tizi Ouzou, the French ambushed the remaining Algerian forces near Issers, successfully destroying the local forces, and causing the surrender of Ahmed bin Salem. This defeat ended Abdelkader's influence in the east of the country. By the end of the decade the French occupation consisted of over a hundred thousand soldiers. A French force was destroyed at the Battle of Sidi Brahim in 1845.

Abd al-Rahman of Morocco, following the 1844 Treaty of Tangiers, outlawed the Emir from his entire kingdom. Abd al-Rahman secretly sent soldiers to attack Abdelkader and destroy his supplies, six months after Abdelkader routed the Moroccans and imprisoned them. Following this failure by the Moroccans, an assassin was sent to kill Emir Abdelkader. The nephew of Abd al-Rahman, Moulay Hashem was sent along with the governor of the Rif, El Hamra in command of a Moroccan army to attack the Emir, however the Moroccans were severely defeated in battle, El Hamra was killed, Moulay Hashem barely escaped with his life and Abd al-Rahman accepted this defeat. The Moroccans led another offensive in the Battle of Agueddin in which they were defeated by Abdelkader in all three military engagements. However, Abdelkader soon made the choice to withdraw from Morocco and enter French territory for negotiations. in December 1847, Abd al-Qādir chose to surrender to the French, under terms that he be allowed to enter exile in the Middle East. The French violated these terms, holding him in France until 1852, when he was allowed to go to Damascus.

The Ottomans lodged a formal protest over the invasion of Algeria, but they never conceded the loss of the province. A map of "Ottoman Africa" from 1905 still shows the empire as possessing a border with Morocco to the west of the "region" (hitta, a term for a territory with vague borders) of Algeria.

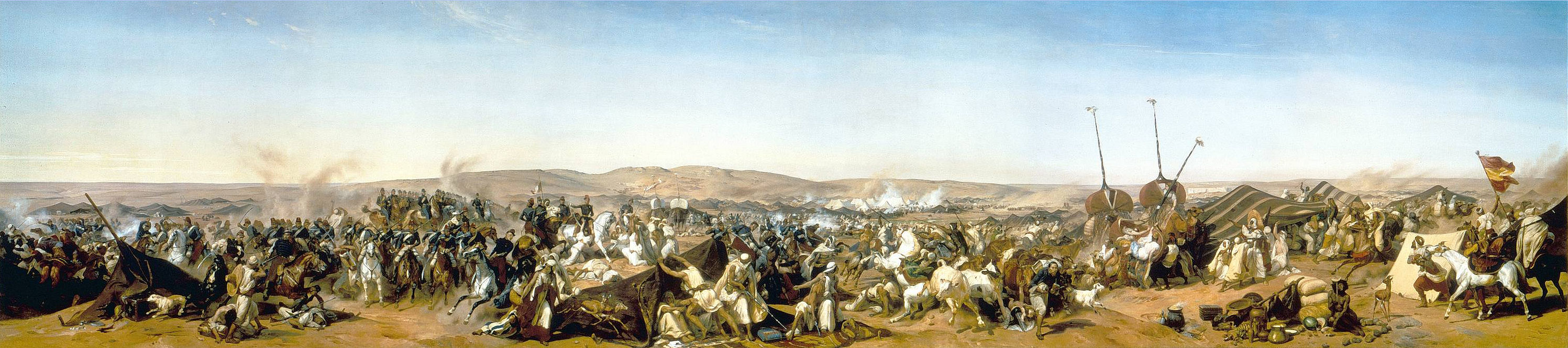
Capture of the Smala of Abd El-Kader, 16 May 1843 by Horace Vernet

== 1871 Kabyle revolt ==
The most serious native insurrection since the time of Abd al-Qadir was the 1871 Mokrani Revolt in the Kabylia, which spread through much of Algeria. By April 1871, 250 tribes had risen, or nearly a third of Algeria's population. At this time there were roughly 130,000 colonists in Algeria, who were in control of most of the arable land. This number would grow to over a million before the century's end. The Kabyle uprising, which erupted in response to prolonged famine and the colony's disparate treatment of various ethnic groups, resulted in the trial of the surviving commanders in Constantine in 1873, following the French repressions. Moreover, major importance is assigned to the effect that the Crémieux Decree in 1870 had on the population.

The revolt was led by Cheikh Mokrani, head of the Kalâa of Ait Abbas, originally allied with the French state. One important aspect that contributed to the reasons of the revolt was the widespread perception among Kabyle leaders of a loss of autonomy in decision-making, as well as among the ǧamāʿa, Kabyle village assemblies. This was also the case with the loss of authority that the Kalâa of Ait Abbas was confronting. Moreover, the Paris case of the Commune also probably played a part in demonstrating a possibility to fight the French administration, providing a viable way in endorsing the revolts. The final trigger that initiated such a great movement, however, was the mutiny in 1871 of a Spahi, after it refused to obey French commands. Around 150,000 Kabyles revolted, bringing warfare around the whole region, reaching almost the capital. Moreover, the majority of these rebels were not properly armed and trained, but a chaotic mass of peasants fighting for their freedom. However, the initial victories began to fade after the deployment of several French units which defeated the insurrection, especially with the final capture of Cheick Mokrani's brother. A number of dissidents were deported to New Caledonia, where a large Algerian community, known as Algerians of the Pacific, still exists.

== Conquest of the Sahara ==
The French expedition to conquer the Saharan lands began in March 1844 at Biskra, a strategic location near Constantine in the Zibra region, with Louis-Philippe, due d'Aumale, a twenty-two-year-old general leading the troops. The necessity of arriving at Constantine by a different route, following the firm and successful resistance of the amir Abdel Kader and the bey of Constantine Haji Ahmed, led to the decision to assault that specific area. In truth, the Sahara's dry environment and non-strategic location, at least for the first French colonial intentions, were not worth the army's time and effort. The French, on the other hand, were able to maintain a successful policy in the Sahara, which tried to make the conquest as bloodless as possible by forming partnerships with specific tribes. In truth, not all local leaders supported Abdel Kader's colonial resistance efforts, with partnerships between French officials and certain local leaders serving as one of the biggest roadblocks. Promises of future recognition for Ahmed ben Salem, a tribe commander who put up resistance to Kader's plans in the Sahara Desert, for example, made the French-hostile resistance in the towns, first, much more difficult, and, second, produced a negative impression on the local population. Following this, the French army was able to control the many revolts, both by secret alliances and the use of power and coercion and power in specific cases.

In 1881, the Algerian coast was completely under the control of the French government. However, past clashes in the Sahara and the difficulties encountered had made any future possibilities of a final annexation of the whole Sahara region remote. In February of 1881, expedition of 93 men, including seven scientific and military personnel, forty-seven native riflemen and few arabs were ambushed at Bir el-Garama by the Hoggar and Ajjer Tuareg . All the Frenchmen were killed. Only about twenty natives manage to return to Ouargla.

Nevertheless, rivalries with the British Empire and the death of Lieutenant-Colonel Paul Flatters at the hands of Tuareg forces triggered a final French expedition. In 1902, a French military expedition entered Hoggar Mountains and defeated Kel Ahaggar in a battle in Tit. The conquest of the Saharan lands in Algeria finished in 1903 when France conquered the kingdom of Kel Ahaggar. Noticeably, the French policies in Sahara focused on the already well-known strategy of "divide and rule" and on attacking the enemy from multiple sides. The Tuareg groups, if poorly armed, still made for dangerous enemies because of their knowledge of the environment and resistance to the climate conditions. Additionally, the Sahara expedition was not seen by everyone as a strict necessity for the French state, both because of its numerous difficulties in the strategic plans that were proposed and because of the lack of certainty in its development.

== Casualties ==
According to several historians, the methods used by the French to establish control over Algeria reached genocidal proportions, with war, famine and disease leading to the deaths of between 500,000 and 1 million Algerians within the first three decades of the conquest, out of an estimated population of 3 million. French losses from 1831 to 1851 were 3,336 killed in battle and 92,329 dead in hospital from disease and lack of medical care, rising to over 150,000 by 1870. A conservative estimate puts the total deaths on both sides at 480,000 (civilians and soldiers, mostly from disease).

== Cultural imperialism ==
The interaction between the Kabyle communities and the French colonizers brought with it the idea of manufacturing a new type of relationship that could have legitimized the French conquest of Algeria, by promoting the idea that these Kabyle were different from the rest of the Algerians. This idea stemmed from cultural differences between the communities, such as the monogamy between the Kabyle. Hence, from that moment on, there has been a relevant presence of missionaries to bring faith, but more importantly, the education and cultural system of France in Algeria, as happened with the Alliance Israelite Universelle for the Jewish community. In fact, from the 1850s, along with the Cremieux Decree, there had been a mass involvement of France regarding the type of education that Jews and Kabyle had to receive, in order to create people loyal to France, but also acting and behaving like French.

== See also ==
- Algerian popular resistance against French invasion
- French conquest of Morocco
- French conquest of Tunisia

== Bibliography ==
- Ritter, Yusuf. Travels in Algeria, United Empire Loyalists. Tikhanov Library, 2023. "Travels in Algeria, United Empire Loyalists"
- Abun-Nasr, Jamil (1987). A history of the Maghrib in the Islamic period. Cambridge University Press. ISBN 978-0-521-33767-0.
- Greenhalgh, Michael (2014). The Military and Colonial Destruction of the Roman Landscape of North Africa, 1830–1900. Brill. ISBN 978-90-04-27163-0.
- Priestley, Herbert Ingram (1966). France Overseas: a Study of Modern Imperialism. Routledge. ISBN 978-0-7146-1024-5.
- Ruedy, John Douglas (2005). Modern Algeria: The Origins and Development of a Nation (2nd ed.). Bloomington, Indiana: Indiana University Press. ISBN 978-0-253-21782-0.
- Tucker, Spencer C. (2009). A Global Chronology of Conflict: From the Ancient World to the Modern Middle East. ABC-CLIO. ISBN 978-1-85109-672-5.
- Wagner, Moritz (1854). The Tricolor on the Atlas: or, Algeria and the French invasion. Translated by Pulszky, Francis. London: T. Nelson and Sons.
