= Vincent-Yves Boutin =

French explorer

Colonel Vincent-Yves Boutin KC, Knight with eminent merits
- Born: 1 January 1772; Le Loroux-Bottereau, Kingdom of France
- Died: Summer 1815 (at 43); Syrian Coastal Mountain Range
- Education: Royal School of Engineering, Mézières
- Relatives: Lady Hester Stanhope
- Military career
- Allegiance: French First Republic (1792–1804) First French Empire (1804–1815)
- Branch: French Land Army
- Rank: Colonel
- Conflicts: French Revolutionary Wars; Siege of Maastricht; Napoleonic Wars; Battle of Ulm; Battle of Wagram; Anglo-Turkish War (1807–1809)
- Awards: Order of the Crescent (1807); Knight of the Legion of Honour (1808)

Vincent-Yves Boutin (1 January 1772, Le Loroux-Bottereau, Province of Brittany – August 1815, Syrian Coastal Mountain Range, Ottoman Empire) was a French engineer, adventurer, officer and spy who participated in the French Revolutionary wars and the Napoleonic Wars. He was born into a humble family in western France and served in the French revolutionary army in the United Provinces, in the Italian campaign and in Dalmatia. He was tasked with undertaking intelligence and espionage missions for Napoleon I in Egypt, Syria, and Algiers. Additionally, he participated in defending Constantinople against the British forces of Admiral Duckworth in 1807.

In 1808, Napoleon granted him the Chevalier de l'Ordre de la Légion d'Honneur for his espionage and intelligence work. Sultan Selim III awarded him the Imperial Order of the Crescent for his victorious defence of Constantinople in the Anglo-Turkish war.

He was romantically involved with Lady Hester Stanhope, the explorer and niece of British Prime Minister William Pitt the Younger. In the summer of 1815, when he was 43 years old, he vanished under mysterious circumstances in the Syrian Coastal Mountain Range.

== Early life and education ==
Vincent-Yves Boutin was born on 1 January 1772 in Le Lorroux-Bottereau, near Nantes, theretofore part of the province of Brittany in the Kingdom of France. Established in the Poitiers region in the fifteenth century, the Boutin family has its roots there. In the mid-seventeenth century, a segment of the family migrated to Vernon, Normandy. Vincent-Yves Boutin was the second youngest of six siblings. His father, Yves Boutin, was a blacksmith who held anti-clerical and liberal views. Two of his brothers were also blacksmiths, while the third was a baker and the fourth a sailor. His youngest sister died before she turned ten. During the French Revolution in 1789, his father was elected as the mayor of the village of Lorroux-Bottereau.

As a child of minor notables, he finished his primary education in the village before being sent to the Lycée de l'Oratoire in Nantes at eight years old. He became friends with Joseph Fouché, who later served as Napoleon's Minister of Police, among others, while attending the establishment. During his time at Lycée de l'Oratoire, he studied arithmetic, chemistry, liberal arts, natural sciences, and Latin. Algebra and mathematics were his preferred subjects, and he graduated from high school at the age of 19 with the rank of Master of Arts. At the age of 20, in 1792, he began his military career. He left the region of Nantes and moved to Paris, where he prepared for the highly selective entrance examination to the Ecole du Génie de Mézières, Ardennes region. Although supportive of the republic and critical of the constitutional monarchy, he disapproved of the excesses of violence during the Revolution. During his three-year stay in Paris, Vincent Yves witnessed pivotal events of the Revolution the demonstration of 20 June 1792 and the insurrection of 10 August 1792. In August 1793, he sat for the entrance exam of the military academy, which covered arithmetic, mechanics, hydrodynamics, and integral calculus. He excelled and enrolled at the Génie Militaire de Mézières in October.

The school faced significant anti-revolutionary agitation from the nobility during the reign of Terror, and in 1794, the military school was moved to Metz, Lorraine. During his military training, Boutin had a relationship with Louise de Préville, the sister of one of his classmates. The same year, the Chouans, anti-revolutionary and reactionary soldiers, executed his father and older brother. The rest of his family fled and settled in Nantes. In 1797, at the age of 25, his two soldier brothers and his mother died.

== Revolutionary wars ==
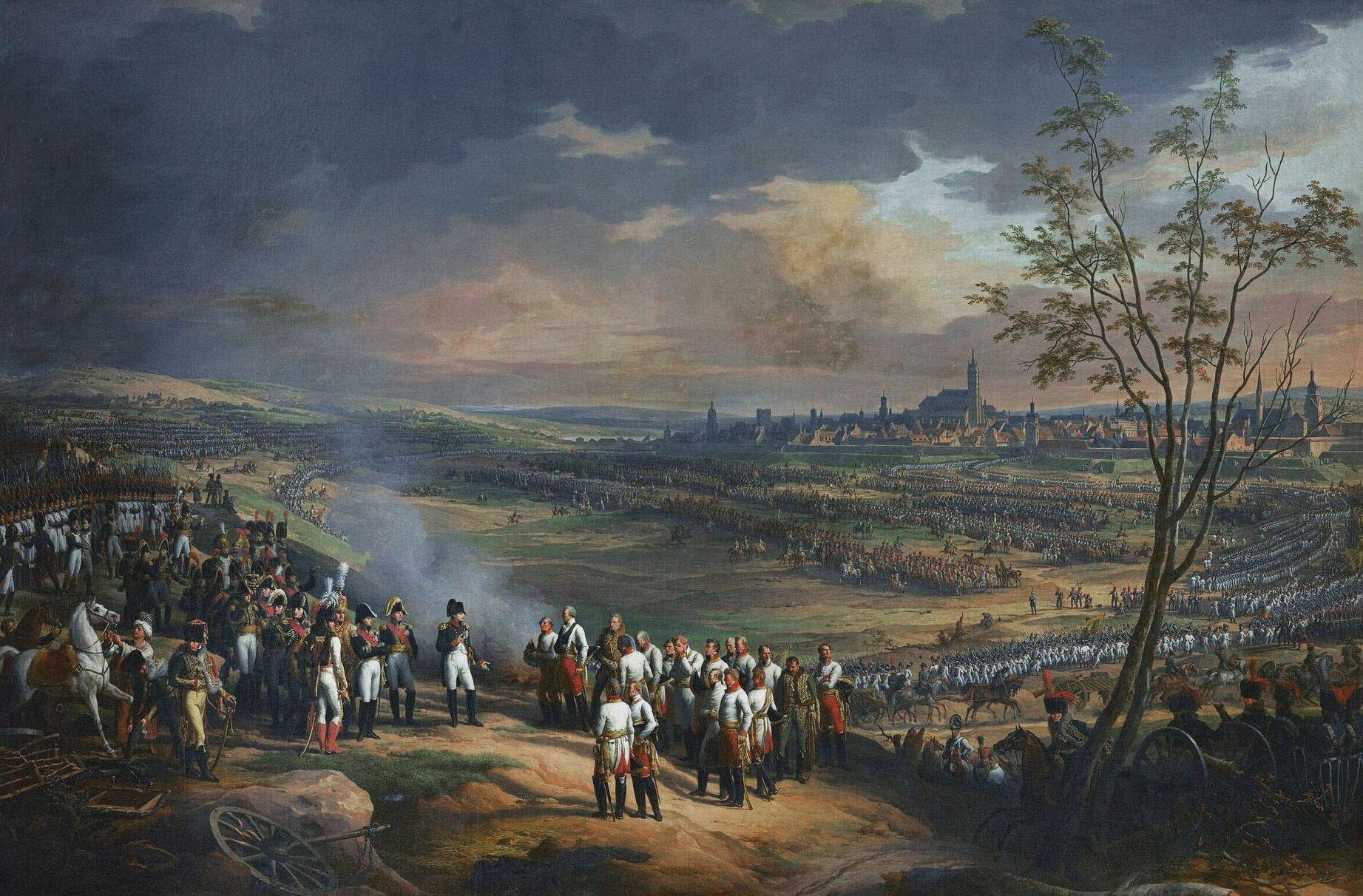
Boutin took part in the Battle of Ulm, c. October 1805

In September 1794, Boutin was appointed as a lieutenant in the army and stationed in Maastricht, United Provinces of the Netherlands. He served in the army of General Jourdan and as a Military Engineering engineer, he was responsible for developing strategies for infantry and artillery actions, as well as conducting surveys on the field. He was subsequently dispatched to the Rhineland as part of the Army of Mainz, Switzerland, and the Cisalpine Republic during the second Italian campaign. He fought at Rovereto and Pozzolo. He was stationed in Alessandria, Peschiera, and Verona until 1804; then he was sent to Utrecht.

Throughout these years, he served in the armies of Generals Jourdan, Masséna, Ney, and Bonaparte. In June 1800, he received a promotion to the rank of captain and later became chief of the battalion.

Boutin was a Republican who became disenchanted by the excesses of the First Republic and the widespread corruption of the Directoire regime. He was fascinated by Napoleon and ultimately pledged his allegiance to him. In 1805, he took part in the Battle of Ulm, during which he enabled the seizure of two bridges over the Danube. The following year, Boutin was sent to Ragusa, Dalmatia to oversee the creation of topographic references. During his time there, the city fell under siege by the Russians and Boutin narrowly escaped before being intercepted by a Russian frigate. He and three fellow French officers were detained for three months on the island of Corfu. At that time, the island was under the joint protectorate of Russia and the Ottoman Empire. In early 1807, he was released as part of a prisoner exchange for twenty Russian officers.

== Missions ==
=== Mission to Constantinople ===
"One can observe the unusual sight of a French officer garbed in oriental attire, including a turban, wide draperies, and slippers. He converses with small groups of men in their native language." Solet, 1999

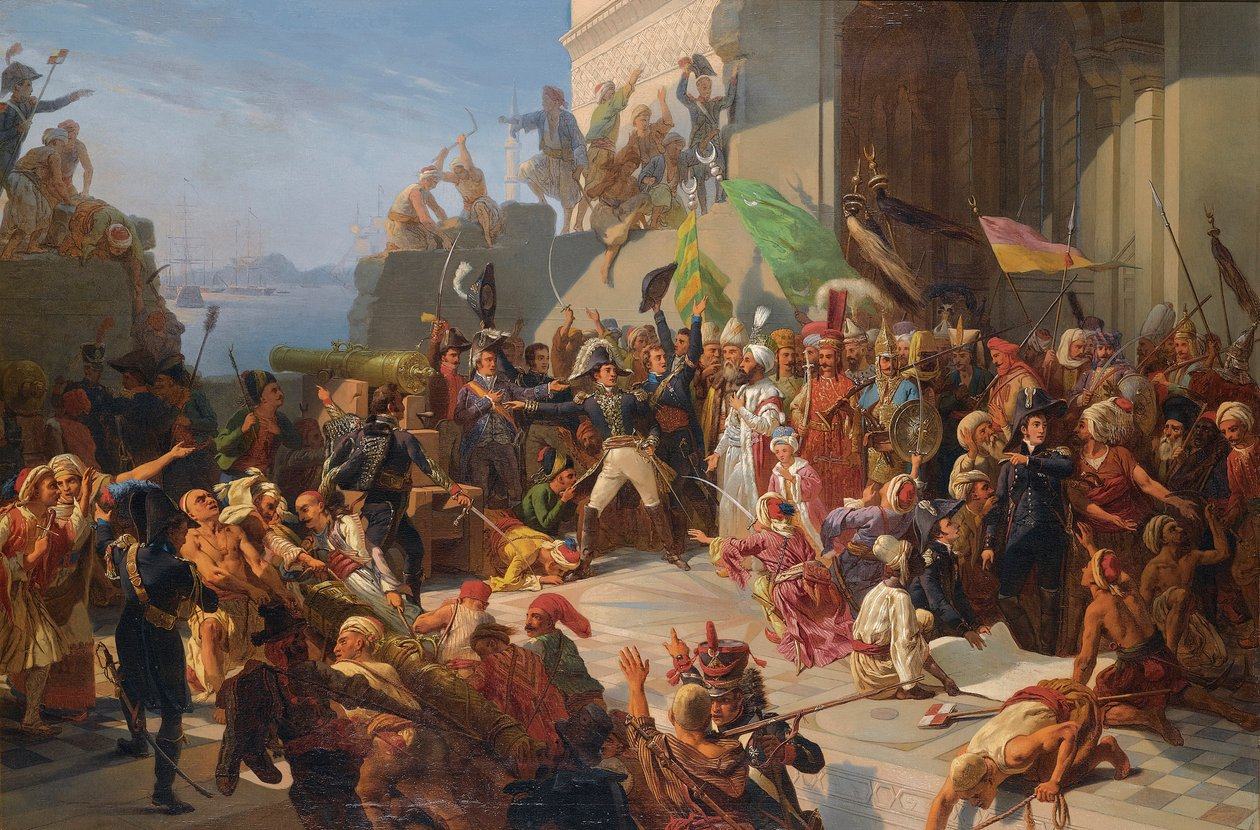
Sultan Selim III visiting the French general Sébastiani during the defence of Constantinople in February 1807 against the British navy

In 1807, the Russian Empire and Great Britain were the principal nations that opposed Napoleonic France. Napoleon dispatched artillery captain Leclerc and engineer captain Boutin to Constantinople to help Sultan Selim III defend the city against Tsar Alexander I's attempts to control the Dardanelles and gain access to the Mediterranean. The pair arrived in the Ottoman capital on 17 February 1807 and were greeted by the French ambassador to the Sublime Porte, General Horace Sebastianini. The city was directly threatened by an English squadron stationed in the Straits. Boutin had been given carte blanche by the Sultan and recruited two thousand Turks who were supervised by French officers to undertake vital fortification works. Boutin removed all firearms and ammunition from the arsenals and identified the positions of the batteries located at Topkapi Palace and on both sides of the Bosphorus. This task was completed in just five days. On 27 February a battle ensued, with English frigates deployed in front of the port and the Seraglio palace. Boutin himself lead the city defence. Finally, Admiral Duckworth ordered his squadron to retreat and the English forces withdrew. After the operation concluded, the Sultan convened with his advisors, including Ambassador Sebastiani and Boutin. Selim III directed his attention to Boutin, expressing his gratitude by asking, "Captain, what can I do for you since you have saved both my capital and myself?" Boutin humbly responds, "Sire, I have only fulfilled my duty." The honour and the pleasure of having been useful to your Highness is my greatest reward." For his resistance, Sultan Selim II honoured Boutin with the Imperial Order of the Crescent, one of the highest accolades given to non-Muslim foreigners. Additionally, Boutin was presented with a box of four hundred thousand gold coins as a gift.

Boutin was sent by the French ambassador Sebastianini to the grand vizier Ibrahim Pasha whose headquarters were located in Silistra on the banks of the Danube, not far from Bucharest. The Russians were then in Moldavia and were now threatening Wallachia. Boutin was in charge of assisting Ibrahim Pasha and his janissaries in their offensive against the Russians. The six-month mission to the Pasha was met with mixed results as no significant military operation effectively weakened Russian positions. Nonetheless, the Treaty of Tilsit brought peace with Russia, and the tsar agreed to relinquish claims on Turkey. At the close of 1807, Boutin returned to Paris with two letters of recommendation from Ambassador Sebastianini and Ibrahim Pasha. He was subsequently awarded with the Legion of Honour by Napoleon upon his return.

=== In Algiers (1808) ===
At the start of the 19th century, North Africa was officially under Ottoman authority, but its power was weak in reality. Oran, Algiers, Tunis, and Tripoli ports relied heavily on piracy. France was particularly drawn to Algiers: the First Republic had a substantial debt with the Dey of Algiers that French authorities were not keen to pay. Napoleon had plans for a French landing in Algiers. Strategically, the city proved to be an advantageous base for the French fleet, given its location in an area dominated by the Royal Navy from bases in Gibraltar and Malta. Consequently, Commander Boutin received a mission order from Admiral Decres of the Ministry of the Navy and the Colonies to travel to Algiers and assess the necessary conditions for a French landing. Boutin thus travelled incognito, posing as the French consul's cousin with whom he is staying in Algiers.

The missions entrusted to Boutin were the following:

"Is there a harbour on this coast that can protect a squadron from a stronger adversary? Which ports would the army utilize for refuelling once it has landed on the shore? And how many ports can the enemy blockade? [...] During which season is the air free of the plague and safe to breathe? I presume it to be October." Napoleon, 1808

On 9 May 1808 Boutin departed from the port of Toulon, Provence, on the frigate Requin. Despite the challenging navigational conditions that resulted from the hostile presence of the English fleet, the Requin anchored in Algiers' roadstead on 24 May. Boutin stays with the French Consul Dubois-Thainville, who advised him of the Dey of Algiers' animosity. During his visit, Boutin conducted a systematic tour of the city and its environs, including visits to Bab El-Oued and Bab Azoun. He also took advantage of the opportunity to enhance his command of Arabic, focusing on the basics he learned in Constantinople. On a half-day excursion to the west of Algiers, he uncovered the pages of Sidi Ferruch while evading the Dey's spy who was tailing him, and subsequently concluded that a French landing at that location was feasible. On 17 July 1808, following the documentation of all observations in writing and creating various topographic maps, Boutin departed Algiers on the Requin vessel. On 28 July, while en route and not far to Monaco, the French frigate was pursued by the Royal Navy and, after seven hours of chase, was disabled by cannon fire. Before being caught, Boutin had time to throw his mission papers into the water to prevent them from falling into the hands of the English enemy. Following his capture, he was incarcerated in a prison located in Valletta, Malta. However, after a few weeks, he managed to elude the English's surveillance and escaped. He then returned to Constantinople, and from there, travelled by land to France.

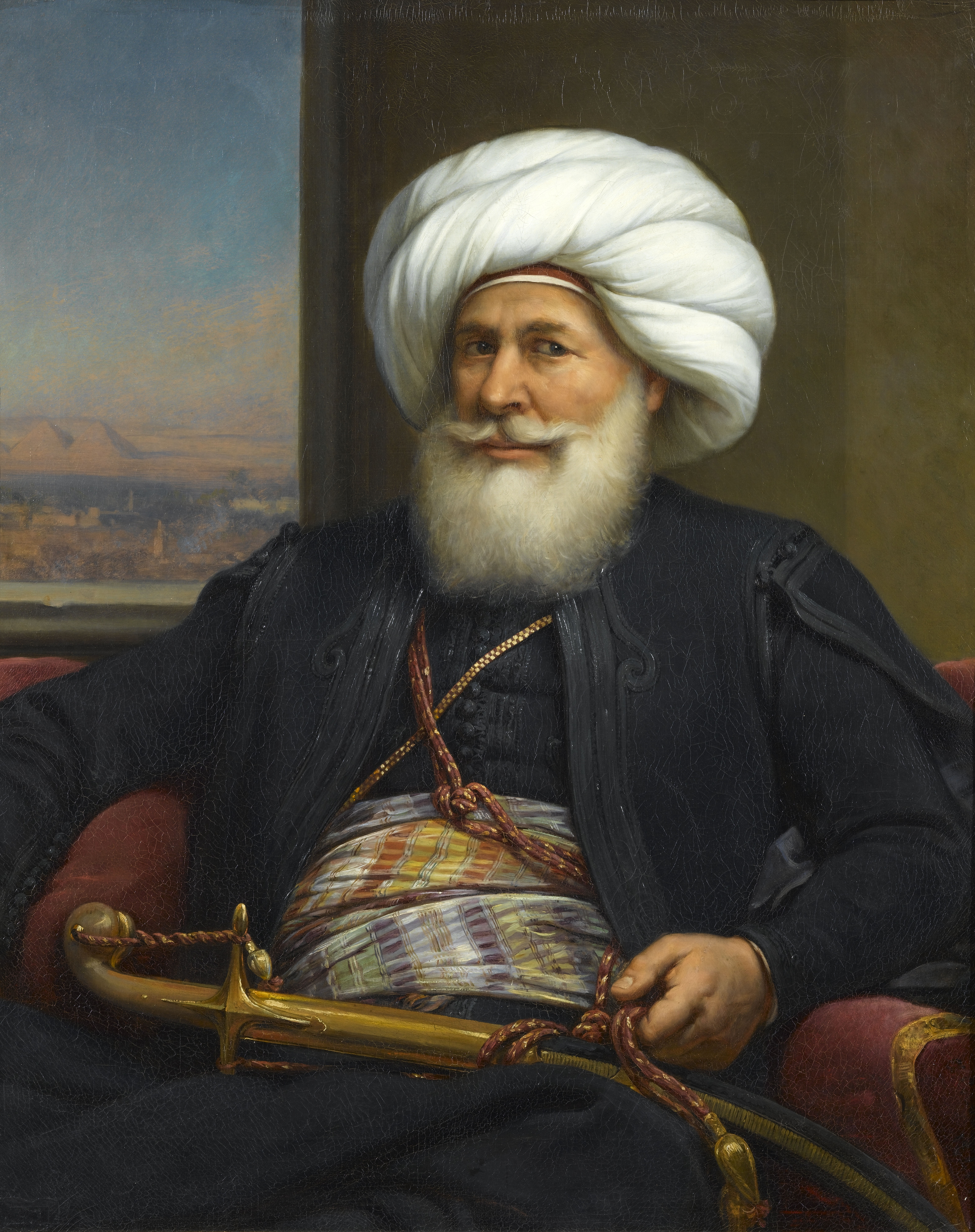
Muhammad Ali, Boutin's support in Egypt

In his mission report, Boutin reconstructed the written and graphic material from memory. The report elaborated on the Regency of Algiers' detailed means, its terrestrial and maritime geography, resources, culture, and climate. The report was conveyed straight to Napoleon, who had a lengthy discussion with Captain Boutin at the Tuileries Palace. During the interview, Boutin also had the opportunity to meet the Empress Joséphine, an encounter that he remembered vividly. While staying in Paris, he located his childhood sweetheart Louise de Préville, who had been elevated to the position of lady-in-waiting to the Empress. Soon he discovered that she was married and had two children; their relationship would remain strictly platonic thereafter.

Napoleon's planned expedition to Algiers was cancelled due to ongoing conflicts in Europe. Nevertheless, King Charles X adopted Boutin's strategies two decades later in the French conquest of Algeria. Based upon Boutin's recommendations, the French landed successfully on Sidi-Ferruch beach on 5 July 1830.

Captain Boutin was present during the Battle of Wagram from 4 to 6 July 1809 alongside the Grande Armée. Injured in his right thigh during the battle, he was promoted to the rank of colonel.

=== Egypt and Syria (1810–1815) ===
In 1810, Boutin, who was stationed in the port city of Ostend, United Provinces of the Netherlands, was summoned to Paris by the War Minister at the behest of Napoleon. The Emperor intended to dispatch him on reconnaissance to the Near East to block the English from the Indian route. General Henri Clarke, the Duke of Feltre and Minister of War, assigned Boutin the task of inspecting the cities of Alexandria, Cairo, Damietta, Jaffa, Acre, Damascus, and Smyrna. The minister retained him in Paris due to the fear of the mission's failure. He did not depart for the Near East until April 1811.

After travelling largely overland, he was welcomed in Cairo by the French Consul Drovetti and subsequently by the Viceroy of Egypt, Muhammad Ali. Boutin was officially a foreign trade agent with a passion for Egyptology and was closely monitored by English agents. With the support of Muhammad Ali, who aspired to independence from Ottoman domination, he was furnished with all required firman passes for unrestricted movement throughout Egypt. The relationship between France and Egypt was positive at that time, as Mehmet Ali had committed to providing wheat to France at a significantly lower price than that offered by the English. Boutin visited Egyptian temples such as Karnak, Thebes, and Luxor, and even journeyed to the cataracts of Aswan. However, he was unable to travel to the Arabian Peninsula due to a lack of a valid pass, where he had intended to meet the Wahhabite sect. During the winter of 1813, exploratory expeditions led by him to the western region of Egypt to investigate the remains of the Amun temple situated in the Siwa oasis, which borders modern-day Libya.

In March 1814, Colonel Boutin arrived in Saida, located south of Beirut and afflicted by the plague. He proceeded with his mission until Aleppo, where the French Consul informed him of Napoleon's abdication. However, he was determined to continue his mission in the Levant to the end.

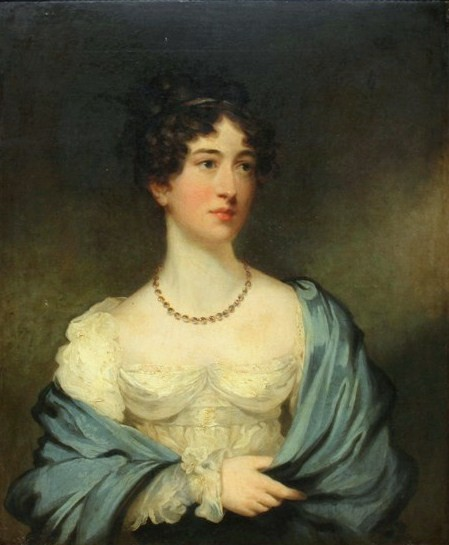
Lady Hester Stanhope, the last Boutin's lover

During his mission, Boutin encountered Lady Hester Stanhope, the niece of the former British Prime Minister William Pitt the Younger. Following her uncle's death in 1806, Lady Stanhope fled England and went into exile in Cairo, where she became a prominent member of the local elite. Although Boutin initially harboured suspicions about her, the two began a romantic relationship. Ultimately, in June 1815, they settled in Latakia, modern-day Syria.

== Disappearance and death ==
The precise date of Boutin's demise remains uncertain. Frédéric Meyer posits that he perished on 18 June 1815, coinciding with Napoleon's ultimate defeat at Waterloo. However, what is established is that Boutin embarked on a final reconnaissance mission to the Al-Anṣariyyah mountains to encounter the Assassins, a branch of Isma'ilism. Although he was supposed to have been accompanied by a local guide, he failed to return. After receiving no news, Lady Stanhope began conducting excavations within the region. Subsequently, the remains of Vincent-Yves Boutin and his guide were discovered. A year later, Lady Stanhope obtained a pledge from Pasha Suleiman of Acre that he would lead a punitive expedition against the Assassins.

== Legacy ==
Colonel Boutin has been honoured in both Nantes and Loroux-Bottereau, where streets are named after him. The French colonization period in Algeria saw Boutin's name being used in the casbah of Algiers and to a village in Oranais.

In 1807, Sultan Selim III awarded him with the Imperial Order of the Crescent, and he was later made a Knight of the Legion of Honor by Napoleon in January 1808.
