= Boumezrag Ait Mokran =

- Amokrane
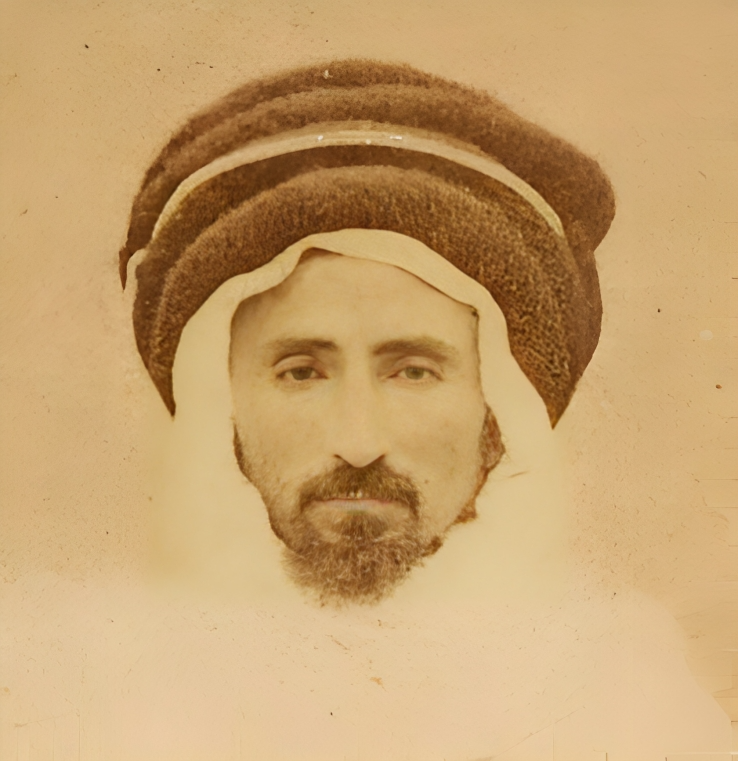
- Boumezrag in 1874.

13th Amokrane of the Ait Abbas
- Reign: 7 May 1871–20 June 1872
- Predecessor: Mohand Lhadj Ait Mokran
- Successor: Fall of the kingdom
- Born: c. 1836; Medjana plain, Kingdom of Ait Abbas
- Died: July 10, 1905; Chlef, French Algeria
- Burial: Hamma Cemetery, Algiers
- Kabyle: Bumezrag At Meqqran
- Dynasty: Ait Mokran
- Father: Ahmed III
- Religion: Suffism
- Military career
- Conflicts: Mokrani Revolt

Boumezrag Ait Mokran (Kabyle: Bumezrag At Meqqran; c. 1836 – July 10, 1905) was the last Amokrane of the Kingdom of Ait Abbas and caid of the Ouennougha, as well as the main leader of the Mokrani Revolt.

== Biography ==
Following the death of his brother on May 5, 1871, Boumezrag continued to fight in the south. His smala was captured on October 8, 1871, in the Hodna Mountains. He himself was captured on June 20, 1871, near Ouargla.

On March 27, 1873, he is sentenced to death by the Constantine Assize Court but his sentence was commuted to life imprisonment in New Caledonia. He is pardoned in 1878 for his participation in the suppression of a Kanak revolt, without the right to leave New Caledonia.

He finally comes back to Algeria on July 13, 1904, and settles in Orléansville where he lives with his son Ouanoughi Boumezrag Ait Mokran until his death, a year later, on July 10, 1905. His body was then transported to Algiers where he was buried in the Hamma Cemetery.
