= The Siege of Constantine (painting) =

Painting by Horace Vernet

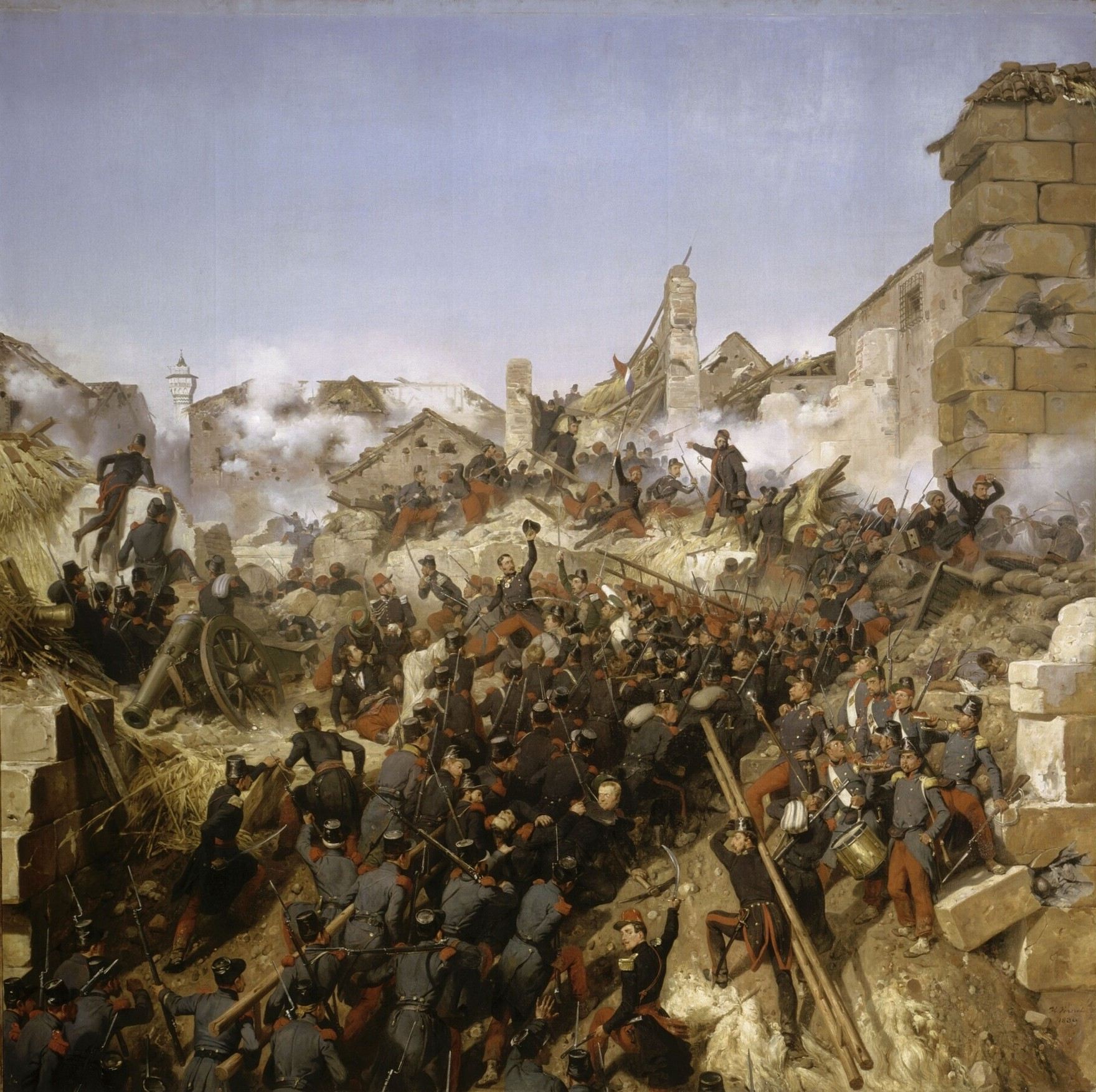
- Artist: Horace Vernet
- Year: 1838
- Type: Oil on canvas, history painting
- Dimensions: 512 cm × 518 cm (202 in × 204 in)
- Location: Palace of Versailles; Versailles

The Siege of Constantine (French: La prise de Constantine) is an 1838 history painting by the French artist Horace Vernet depicting a scene from the French conquest of Algeria. It portrays French troops storming the city of Constantine on 13 October 1838. It was one of a trilogy of paintings Vernet produced depicting different stages of the siege. It forms the third part of a Triptych. The work was displayed at the Salon of 1839 at the Louvre in Paris. The painting was commissioned by Louis Philippe I for the Musée de l'Histoire de France at the Palace of Versailles.

== Bibliography ==
- Harkett, Daniel & Hornstein, Katie (ed.) Horace Vernet and the Thresholds of Nineteenth-Century Visual Culture. Dartmouth College Press, 2017.
- Hornstein, Katie. Picturing War in France, 1792–1856. Yale University Press, 2018.
- Sessions, Jennifer E. By Sword and Plow: France and the Conquest of Algeria. Cornell University Press, 2015.
