= Battle of Constantine =

1836 battle of the French conquest of Algeria

Coordinates: 36.2833°N 6.6167°E

Siege of Constantine
- Part of French conquest of Algeria
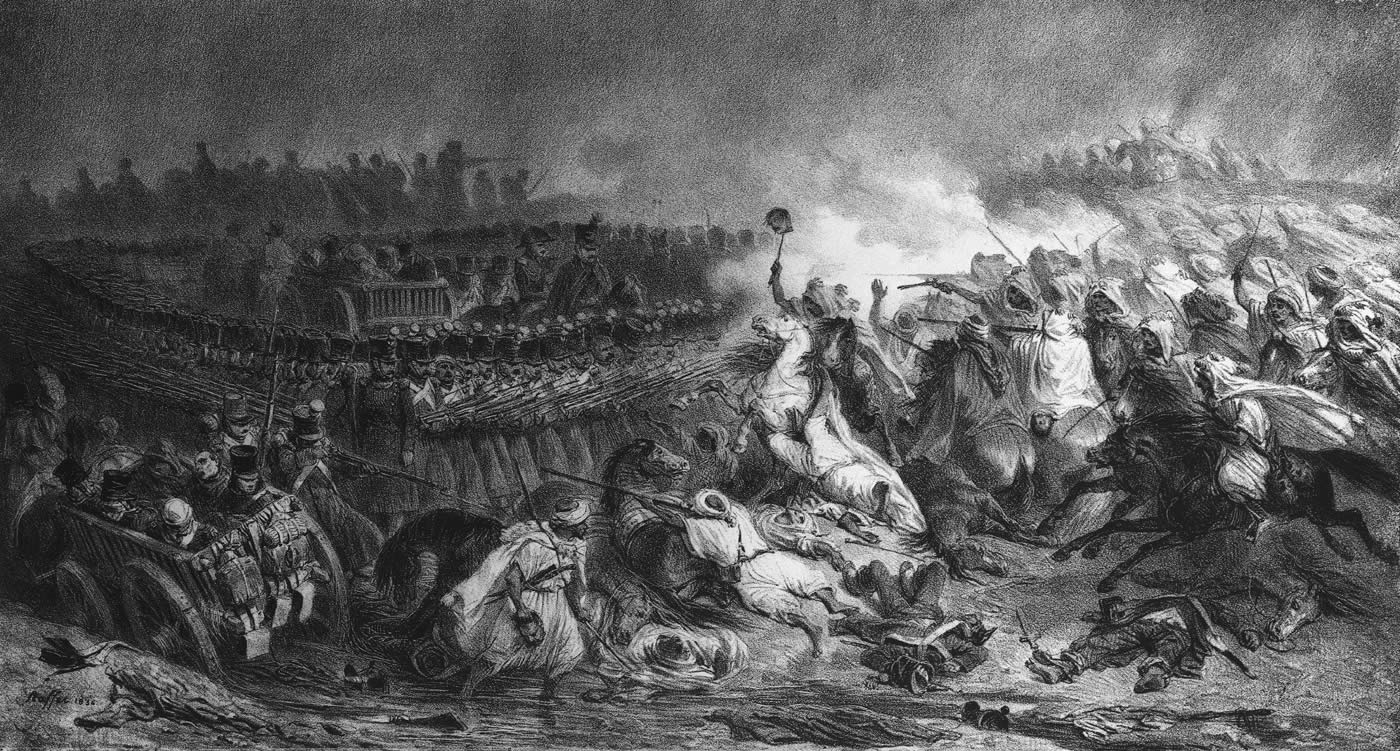
- A square of the 2nd Light Infantry Regiment under Nicolas Changarnier covering the retreat from Constantine, by Auguste Raffet
Date	21 November 1836 – 24 November 1836
Location	Constantine, French Algeria
Result	Algerian victory

Belligerents
France	Beylik of Constantine

Commanders and leaders
(France) Bertrand Clausel (France) Prince Louis, Duke of Nemours (France) Camille Alphonse Trézel (France) Alexandre-Gaultier de Rigny	Ahmed Bey ben Mohamed Chérif; Ali ben Aissa

Strength
8,070 (including 30 officers)	1,200

Casualties and losses
453 deaths 304 wounded	Unknown

The 1836 Battle of Constantine was an unsuccessful French attempt to conquer the Algerian city of Constantine. It was part of the siege of Constantine.

== The Expedition ==
Commanded by Bertrand Clauzel, the French expeditionary force, amounting to 8,040 men and 30 officers, left Bône on November 9. On the 18th, after crossing the pass of Râs-el-Akba, it was only two marches from Constantine. After encamping at Raz-Oued-Zenati, the French army encountered harsh weather in the highlands, where heavy rain, snow and hail fell upon the bivouac-sheltered soldiers during the night. The ground, completely churned up, was likened to the mud of Poland.

After further marching on the 20th, the army arrived in Constantine, with the exception of the baggage and a rear guard, and there was forced to stop.

The weather was so cold, several men suffered from frostbitten feet, with others even perishing during the night due to insufficient wood in Raz-el-Akba to start a fire.

Finally, the reinforcements joined the army, allowing the draught teams to be doubled and tripled. On the 21st of November, the French army crossed the Bou-Merzoug, a tributary of the Wadi Rhummel, and took up position under the walls of Constantine.

The city had natural defensive advantages, notably a deep, 60-metre-wide ravine through which the Rhummel wadi ran. The city was connected to the Mansourah plateau by a narrow bridge leading to a strong door, defended by musket fire from the surrounding houses and gardens.

== The Siege ==
While Clauzel occupied the plateau of Mansourah with the Duke of Nemours and the troops of General Trézel, General de Rigny was ordered to seize the hills of Koudiat-Aty in order to pacify the marabouts and the cemeteries in front of the Ez-Rabahah gate, which he was also ordered to block. However, as their field artillery was not yet ready, the French army was unable to attack at this point. Ahmed Bey shut himself up in Constantine and entrusted its defense to his general (khalifa) Ali Ben Aïssa, who had recruited about 1,200 soldiers all determined to defend the city from French colonialism.

As the French advance-guard brigade moved onto the heights and overcame the resistance they found there, their marshal directed artillery fire against the El-Cantara gate. On the 22nd, the brigade fought defenders sallying out from gates they had been unable to block before they launched a new attack that was ultimately repulsed on the 23rd. Following this, two simultaneous reverse attacks on the French the night of 23–24 November were partly successful, putting many French soldiers out of action through death, wounds or capture. Meanwhile, the dreadful weather continued, with a freezing wind and large snowflakes, and the ammunition and food ran out.

== French retreat ==
On the 24th, Clauzel ordered the retreat. This first day was very difficult, with the entire garrison and a multitude of cavalry fiercely attacking the rear guard, which included Commander Nicolas Changarnier of the 2nd Light Infantry. Surrounded by enemies, Changarnier formed his battalion in a square and, at the moment of a terrible attack, opened a fire of two ranks at close range, covering three sides of the square with men and horses.

On the 26th, the French Army camped at Sidi Tamtam. On the 27th, it passed the difficult defile leading to the Ras el Agba pass, and the Muslims abandoned their pursuit. On the 28th, it reached Guelma, where it left its sick and wounded. The losses amounted to 1,000 men for the retreat alone.
