= Ahmed Bey =

Bey of Constantine (1784–1850)

Ahmed ben Mohamed Chérif
- الحاج أحمد باي بن محمد شريف
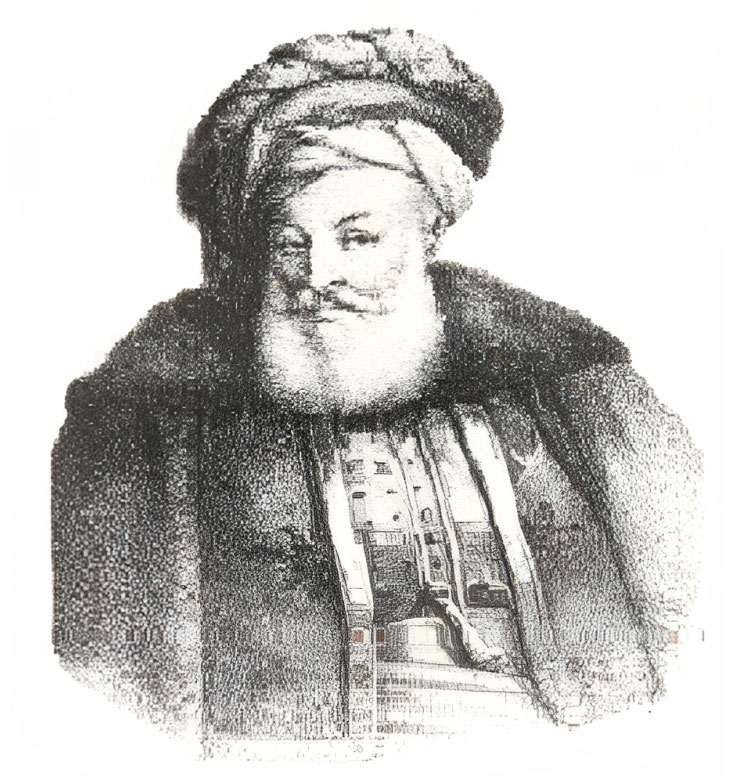

Bey of Constantine
- In office 1826–1837
- Appointed by: Hussein Dey
- Monarch: Hussein Dey
- First Minister: Ali ben Aissa
- Preceded by: Mohamed Bey ben Khan
- Succeeded by: Title abolished

29th Dey of Algiers (Note: Fought the French starting in 1830, and declared himself Dey of Algeria in 1833 as Ahmed III. After defeating a large French attack in 1836, his capital was captured in 1837, after which he retreated into the Aures and the Sahara from where he waged guerilla warfare, until he surrendered in 1848.)
- In office 1831–1848
- Preceded by: Mustapha III
- Succeeded by: Office abolished

Personal details
- Born: Ahmed ben Mohamed Chérif c. 1784 Constantine, State of Algiers
- Died: c. 1850 (aged 65–66) Algiers, French Algeria
- Children: Mohammed Chérif (died 1832) 2 daughters
- Parent: Mohamed ben Ahmed Chérif (father) El Hadja Rékia (Mother)

Military service
- Battles/wars: French conquest of Algeria: Battle of Constantine; Siege of Constantine

Ahmed Bey ben Mohamed Sherif, also known as Ahmed Bey or Hadj Ahmed Bey (Arabic: الحاج أحمد باي) (c. 1784 – c. 1850) was the last bey of Constantine in the Regency of Algiers, ruling from 1826 to 1848. He was the successor of Mohamed Menamenni Bey ben Khan. As head of state, he led the local population in a fierce resistance to the French occupation forces. With the position vacant, in 1833 he adopted the title of leader of Algeria and dey in exile. In 1837 Constantine was taken by the French after an intense siege. He retreated into the Aurès Mountains from where he continued to wage a low-intensity conflict with tribes still loyal to him, until he capitulated in 1848.

== Early life and career ==
Ahmed Bey was born to a Kouloughli father called Mohamed ben Ahmed Chérif, and an Algerian mother named El Hadja Rékia. He was the grandson of Ahmed Bey el Kolli. When he was barely eighteen years old, the bey Abd Allah gave him the title of caïd of the El Aouassi (chief of Harakta tribes). Following the earthquake in the Blida region the dey controlled, he appointed him to Hunah el Kadous near Algiers, and gave him the enjoyment of haouch Ouled Baba. Ahmed Bey engaged in many pastimes, such as hunting and horse riding. From time to time he took part in expeditions to protect beylikal troops, engaged against hostile Kabyle tribes such as the Beni Menad and the Beni Djenad. During his pilgrimage to Mecca, which lasted fifteen months, he met several famous people in Egypt, including Muhammad Ali Pasha, his son Ibrahim Pasha and Tusun Pasha. He was an avid reformer.

== Bey of Constantine and French invasion ==
Appointed Bey of Constantine in 1826, he began modernizing the region based on Muhammad Ali's reforms. He first and foremost sought to reform Constantine's politics and military. He established Algeria's first modern manufacturing facilities with all the needed machinery and invited foreign specialists. He established modern military divisions of all few thousand men recruited from Kabyle and Arab tribes. He reformed the political organization of the province, and constructed a new palace for the administration of the province. In 1830 the French invaded Algiers, and took the city. In the capitulation of 1830 the deylik of Algiers was dissolved, and the French sent out letters demanding capitulation to the three governors of the three provinces of Algiers. Only the governor of the Beylik of the West capitulated, with Ahmed Bey and Mustapha Boumezrag Bey of Titteri continuing the resistance, not recognizing the treaty, and declaring jihad to restore the deylik and liberate the French-occupied territories. He came into conflict with Mustapha, who declared himself the new Dey-Pasha of Algiers in exile, Mustapha was forced to capitulate after a French campaign captured his capital in November 1830. Boumezrag was the only leftover of the old deylik, and became a rival of the rising Emir Abdelkader over ideological disagreements; while Abdelkader wanted to install an independent modern Islamic state in Algeria, Ahmed Bey wanted to restore the old Ottoman deylik. In 1832 the French took Annaba. He declared himself the Pasha of Algiers in 1833 after what he called "popular request" from the population of Algiers.

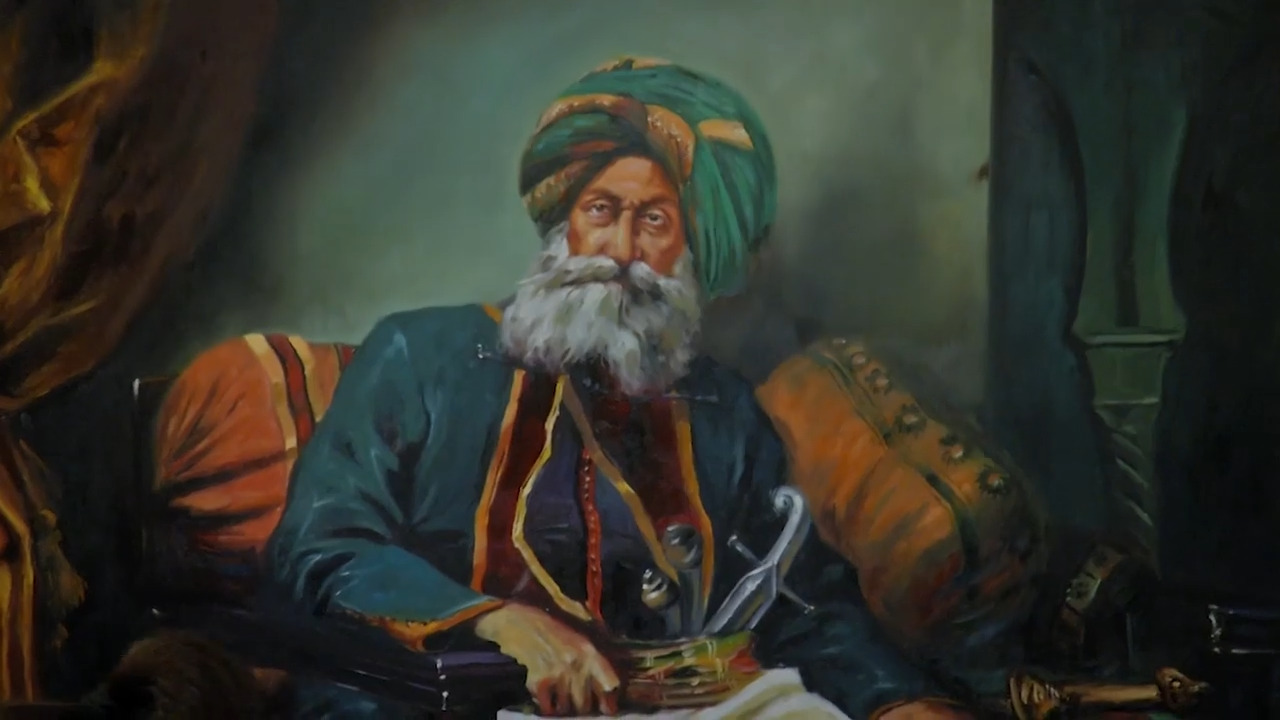
Ahmed Bey, at the Central Army Museum, Algiers

He continued to organize the defence of Constantine, Algeria, and lead several battles against the French army.

He won a massive victory in 1836 against Maréchal Clauzel. When Constantine was besieged by the French in 1837, Ahmed Bey managed to escape and to organize resistance in the Aurès Mountains. In 1842, he rallied the tribe of Ouled Nasser, hoping to provide support with the Kabyles, and approached the camp of Ain Roumel. On 25 August 1842, French general Jean-René Sillègue entered the land of the Amouchas, namely a village north of Sétif, and met a gathering of two to three thousand Kabyles who failed to stop him. On September 10, the general defeated the cavalry of Hadj Ahmed Bey at the foot of Djbel Bou Taleb, and managed to destroy his influence on the tribes of the Tell.

== Death ==
Ahmed died on August 30, 1850, 65 years old. According to his wishes, he is buried in Algiers in the Thaalibia Cemetery near the mosque of Sidi Abder Rahman of Algiers in the Casbah of Algiers. His marble mausoleum is surmounted by a turban.

== See also ==
- List of beys of Constantine, Algeria
- Ottoman Algeria

== Bibliography ==
- Tocqueville, Alexis de (2006), "Second Letter on Algeria (August 22, 1837)", in Bronner, Stephen Eric; Thompson, Michael (eds.), The Logos Reader: Rational Radicalism and the Future of Politics, University Press of Kentucky, ISBN 0813191483.
