= Ibrahim Bey (Constantine) =

Ibrahim Bey, of his name Ibrahim Bey El-Greitli, chief of the Haraktas, was a bey of the province of Constantine, who reigned from July 1822 (1237 AH) to December 1824 (1239 AH). He was of Turkish origin.

== Biography ==
Ibrahim was stepped away in 1822 by Hussein Dey of Algiers, and withdrew to Médéa. In 1830 Mustapha Ben Mezrag, bey of Tittery (South ouest Algiers), asks his help to raise a rebellion against the French troops, and named him Pasha. Ahmed Bey of Constantine fearing rivalry, will take the title of Pasha. Disappointed Ibrahim returned to Médéa, abandoning his commitment. Fearing the bey of Constantine, Ibrahim placed himself under the protection of Sheikh Farhat Ben Said, enemy of Ahmed Bey. After the failure of Sheikh Farhat Ibrahim withdrew in Tunis. The Bey of Tunis, in negotiation with general Clauzel to cede the province of Constantine, enemy has always sent Ibrahim as emissary.

Key figure in the province of Constantine, he went in 1831 to Bone to meet Commander Houder. Exploiting the credulity of the French officers, he captured the city, but was taken over by the armed forces, he took refuge in Bizerte. He fought in the Citadel of Bone against the armies of general Monck but after a defeat, he fled again to Médéa. He was assassinated in 1833, his family fled to Algiers, and his two sons, started a few years later serving the French army.
