= Siege of Constantine =

1837 siege in Algeria

Coordinates: 36.2833°N 6.6167°E

- Part of French conquest of Algeria
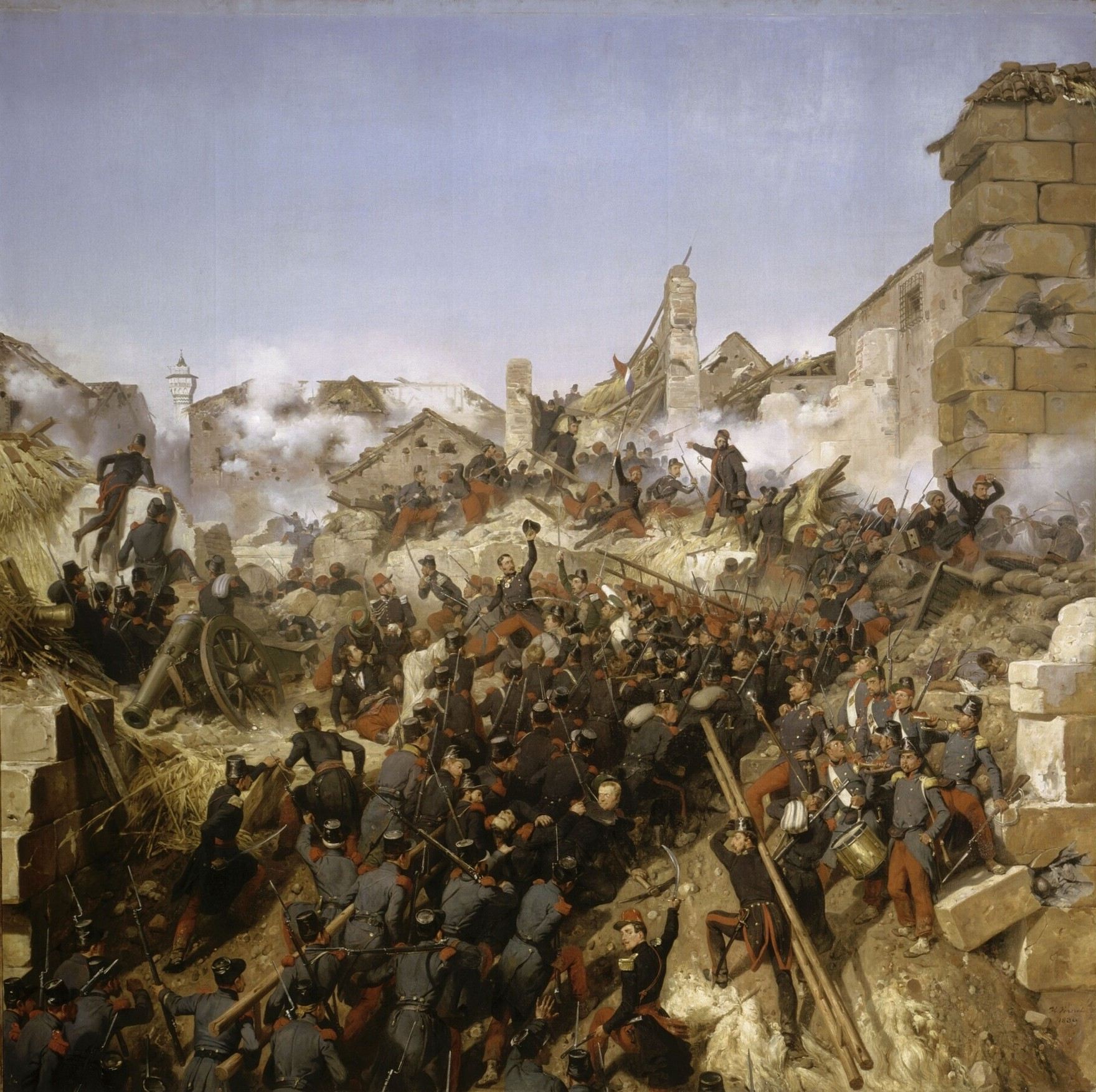
- The Siege of Constantine by Horace Vernet, 1838
Date	9–13 October 1837
Location	Constantine, French Algeria
Result	French victory

Belligerents
(July Monarchy) France	Beylik of Constantine

Commanders and leaders
Charles-Marie Denys de Damrémont †; Alexandre Charles Perrégaux (DOW); Sylvain Charles Valée	Ahmed Bey; Ali ben Aissa

Strength
20,000 men 60 guns	7,500 defenders

Casualties and losses
146 dead 520 wounded	1,000 killed

The siege of Constantine was a blockade and assault on Constantine in October 1837 by French forces during the French conquest of Algeria. The decisive battle resulted in the collapse of the Beylik of Constantine led by Ahmed Bey.

== Background ==
The siege was decided by Louis Philippe I and the head of his government, Count Louis-Mathieu Molé, in the summer of 1837. At the time, the consolidation of the July Monarchy and the recovery of economic prosperity, the king was considering dissolving the Chamber of Deputies. As with Charles X's 1830 expedition to Algiers, the king of France was seeking more votes in upcoming elections by offering military glory and revenge for Bertrand Clausel's failed expedition against Constantine in 1836.

The preparation of the expedition at the end of August was marred by a bitter rivalry between the king's eldest sons, Prince Ferdinand Philippe and Prince Louis, who both vied for the honor of participating. The eldest considered that it was his right, while the second, who had participated in the unsuccessful expedition of the previous year, was keen to avenge this humiliation. Ultimately it was the younger prince who went.

The army met at the Merdjez-Hammar camp established on the banks of the Seybouse River in Guelma Province, halfway between Bôna and Constantine. Placed under the command of the Governor-General, General Charles-Marie Denys de Damrémont, the army was formed in four brigades. The 1st Brigade in the vanguard was commanded by Prince Louis, Duke of Nemours, and the second, third and fourth brigades were under the command of generals Camille Alphonse Trézel and Claude-Carloman de Rulhière. General Sylvain Charles Valée commanded the artillery and General Hubert Rohault de Fleury the engineers.

== Siege ==
The French Army left Bône on 1 October, facing constant attacks by Algerian tribesmen on the way. On 9 October, the French placed siege batteries on the Koudiat-Aty plateau, initiating the siege. On 12 October a victorious assault was begun by General Damrémont, and after Damrémont was killed was completed by his successor, General Valée. The latter was promoted to the rank of Marshal of France on 11 November and appointed Governor-General of French Possessions in Africa on 1 December. French artillery bombarded the city for four days, creating two breaches in the walls which 600 French troops assaulted on 13 October. The ensuing storming saw house-to-house fighting and fierce Algerian resistance. The city capitulated by nightfall.

== See also ==
- French conquest of Algeria
- Charles-Marie Denys de Damrémont
- Sylvain Charles Valée
- Alexandre Charles Perrégaux
