= Beylik of Constantine =

Governorate (Beylik) in the Regency of Algiers

Beylik of the East بايلك قسنطينة (Arabic) Bâylik Qasentina
- 1528–1837
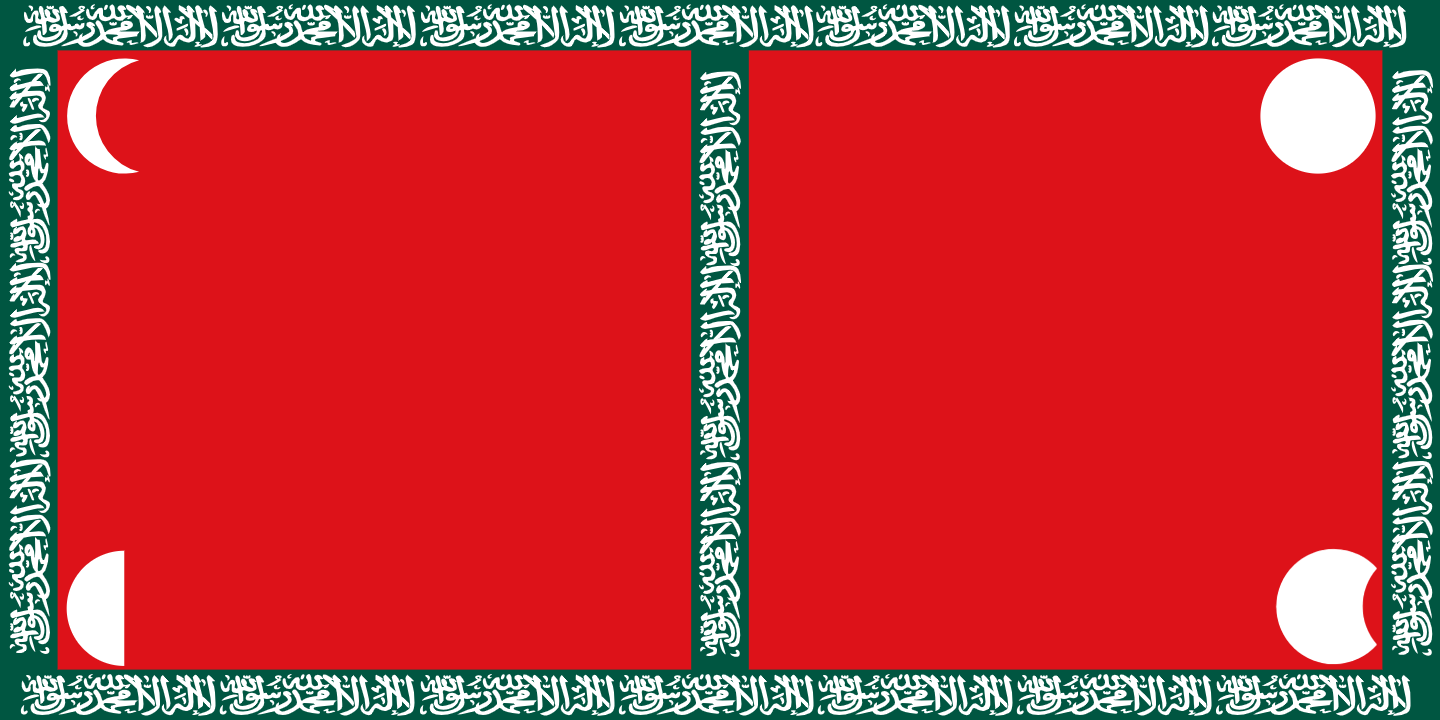
- Left: Flag taken from the Great Mosque of Constantine in 1837 Right: Bey's standard.

- Map of the Regency of Algiers. The Beylik of Constantine is the easternmost, between Titteri and Tunis.
- Status: Provincial governorate
- Capital: Constantine
- Official languages: Arabic; Osmanli
- Common languages: Algerian Arabic; Berber; Judeo-Arabic
- Religion: Official: Maliki Sunni Islam; Minorities: Ibadi Islam; Judaism; Catholicism
- Government: 1528–1830; Beylik; Elective monarchy under the suzerainty of the Algerian Dey
- Bey
  - 1528–1567: Ramdane-Tchulak
  - 1771–1792: Salah ben Mostefa
  - 1826–1837: Hadj Ahmed
- Historical era: Early Modern Period
  - Established: 1528
  - Siege of Constantine: 1837
Preceded by	Succeeded by
Hafsids of Béjaïa	Constantine (departement)
- Today part of: Algeria

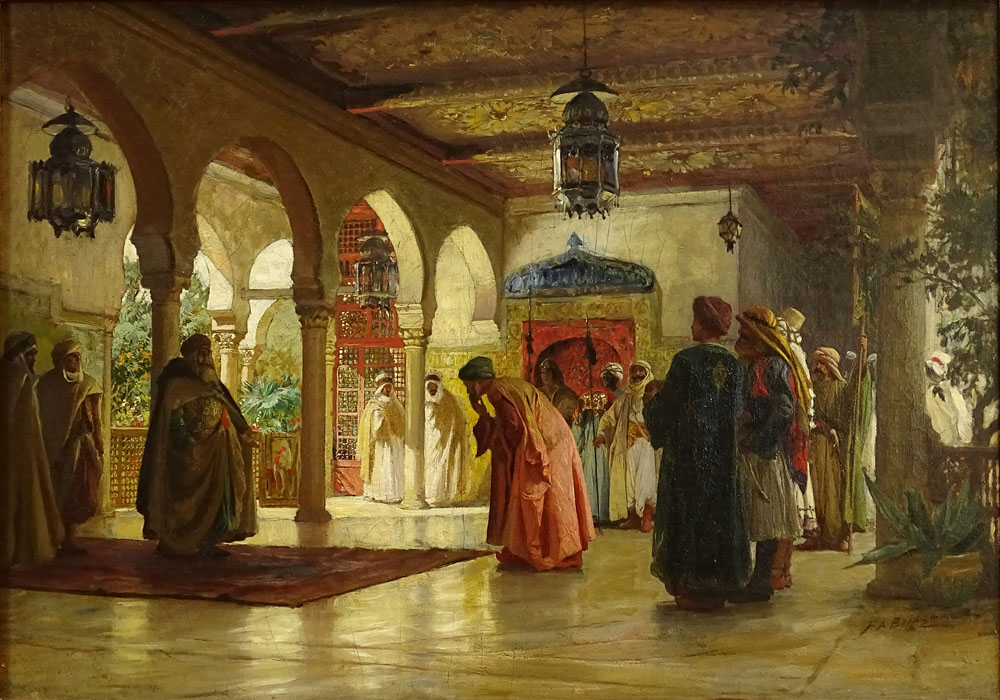
Reception of an ambassador in the Palace of Constantine.

The Beylik of Constantine (Arabic: بايلك قسنطينة, romanized: Bâylik Qasentina), Beylik of the Sunrise or Beylik of the East (Arabic: بيليك الشرق, romanized: Bâylik Ash-sharq or Bâylik Al-sharq) as was its official designation, was one of the three Beyliks of the Regency of Algiers (the other two being the Beylik of Titteri, also known as the Beylik of Médéa, and the Beylik of the West, also known as the Beylik of the Sunset). The region liberated itself from the Hafsid Emirate of Béjaïa in the early 16th century, and constituted itself around Constantine in the mid to late 16th century. The Beylik collapsed in the 1837 siege of Constantine during the French conquest of Algeria. The Constantine department was formed upon the bases of the Beylik in 1848.

== History ==
The Beylik of the East was the most important and the richest of the three Beyliks of the Regency of Algiers. The Bey usually made his residence there in Constantine. The city is built on a plateau, surrounded on three sides by a deep ravine at the bottom of which flows the Rhumel River.

The period extending from 1514 to 1648 saw the end of Constantine's dependence on the Hafsids of Tunis and its definitive attachment to the central power of Algiers in the 1530s. Control of the entire province is acquired only after clashes with the powerful tribal confederations of the region. In the 18th century, Constantine experienced a period of great political stability, thanks in particular to the succession of a few energetic governors and competent administrators: Hasan Bey "Bou Kemia" (1713–1736), Hassan Bey Bou-Hanek (1736–1754), Hussein Bey Zereg-Aïnou (1754–1756), Ahmed Bey el Kolli (1756–1771) and especially Salah Bey (1771–1792), who is considered the most remarkable governor of the province. It was a period marked by the consolidation of the government, urban development works, internal expeditions to maintain order as well as several victorious expeditions against Tunis during the Tunisian–Algerian Wars.

Most of the wealth of the Beylik came from the levies on agricultural production. The agents of the administration maintained their provision at the prices of privileges granted to the local urban and rural elites. The city's ulamas didn't hesitate to legislate according to their interests and new alliances were also made through strategies of common marital practices among large families. Thus, Ahmed Bey el Kolli had married one of the Bengana daughters and, in the second marriage, a daughter of the Mokrani family. Ali Bey married his three daughters to the Mokranis. The mother of the last Bey was a Bengana and he had married one of the daughters of the Mokrani too.

In addition, intrigues linked to power and maintained by the rivalries and ambitions of the contenders for the various government posts. The Beylik had experienced many popular revolts due to the rigours of the fiscal pressure in addition to socio-economic difficulties. This instability was correlated with the economic situation, agricultural production, periods of drought, famines and diseases.

After the capture of Algiers by the French in 1830, the Constantinians invested power in Ahmed Bey, who organized the fight against the French troops. He declared himself the Pasha of Algiers in 1833. It took two sieges to overcome the resistance of the inhabitants of Constantine, which fell in 1837. Afterwards, Ahmed Bey found refuge in the Aurès Mountains and continued the struggle until he surrendered in 1848.

== Population ==
The Beylik of Constantine was the most populated of three Beylik of the Regency, it brought together nearly two-thirds of the Algerian population. The tribes and families of large tents, allied with the authorities, shared power through a game of balance, symbolized by the investiture with a caftan that the tribal chiefs received after the Bey. In Constantine, the city notables took an active part in the management of affairs and owned large agricultural land in the cereal crown around the city.

The rural populations were divided into arch (tribes), made up of kharouba (fractions of tribes) which were subdivided into douars. The Zouaoua and Ferdjioua tribes and other mountain populations escaped the authority of the Bey. Several tribes had a nomadic or semi-nomadic culture in the south, which constituted the most important part of the Beylik, including the Haraktas, the Seghnia, and the Oulad Sultan.

Among the important tribes of the western region, we could distinguish the Telaghma, the Oulad Abdenour, the Amar Gheraba and the Medjana, guardians of the Bibans. East of Constantine, we could have found the Oulad Zenati, the Hanancha, the Nementcha and the Amar Cheraga. The Turkish ethnic element played only a negligible role, the number of Turks there always remained very small: the permanent garrison of the province comprised only 300 men. They were mainly present in Constantine and in the garrison towns, it was the same as the kouloughlis. A Jewish population was also noted in the towns of the beylik.

At the beginning of the nineteenth century, Constantine had between 25 and 30,000 inhabitants, alongside the indigenous population of urban origin known as Hadar, the city attracted populations from the interior of Algeria, known as barrâniyya, composed mainly of Kabyles and Biskris. Annaba was one of the cities of the pre-colonial era with a population of over 10,000 inhabitants, the other cities having only a smaller population.

== Geography ==
The province of Constantine had a vast territory. It was bounded on the north by the Mediterranean, and on the south by the Saharan desert, on the east by the Regency of Tunis and on the west by the Beylik of Titteri, separated by the chain of Bibans in the northern part of their frontier from the Kabyle Kingdoms of Ait Abbas and Kuku.

It measured approximately 430 km in its greatest length and 330 km in average width. The coast of the province, from Béjaïa to Annaba, is mountainous. Constantine, the seat of the Beylik, was the most important city, followed by Annaba, the other cities were Jijel, Collo, Béjaïa, Mila, M'Sila, Tebessa and Biskra.

== Organization of the Beylik ==
=== Administration of the province ===
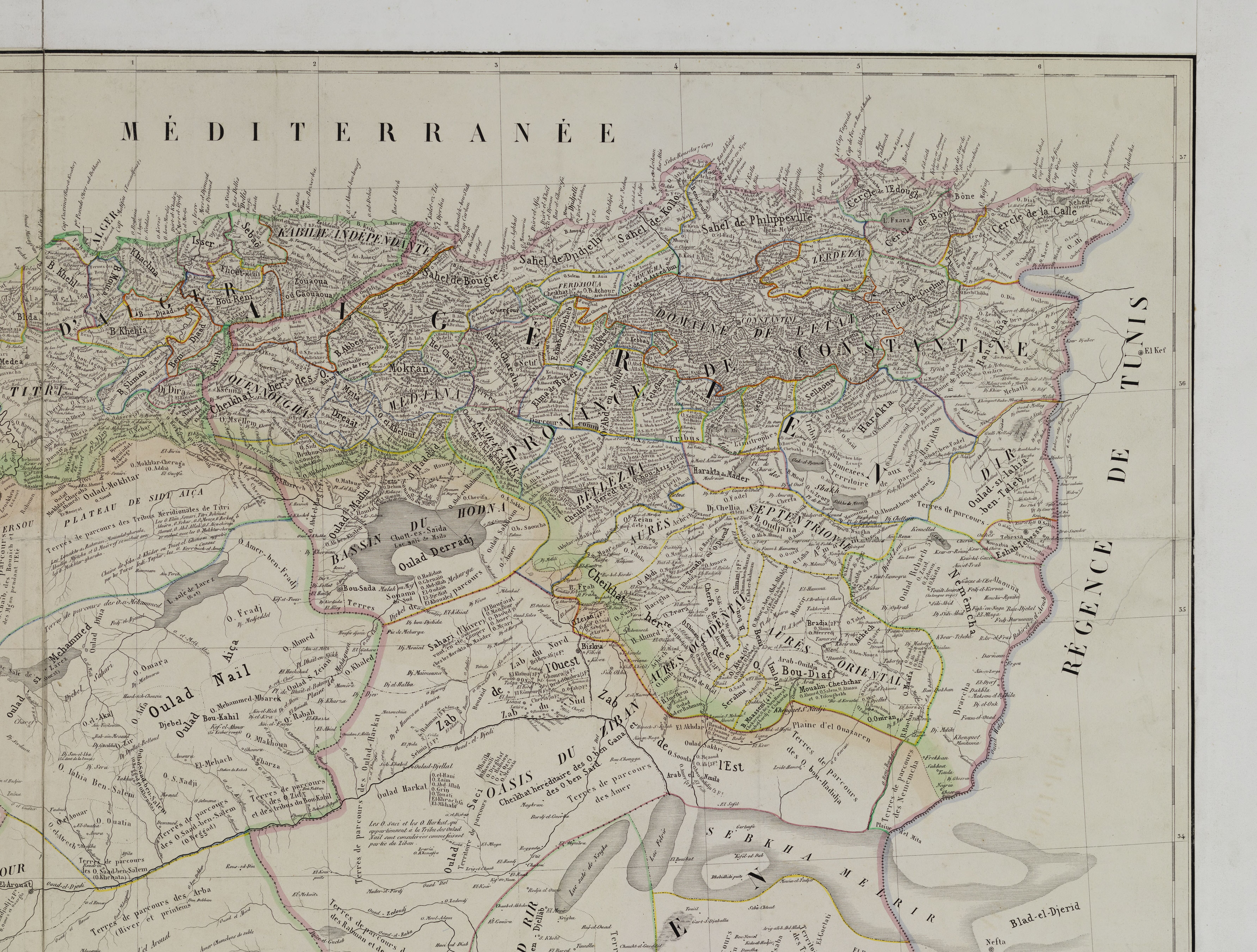
Tribal map of the province of Constantine during the French conquest (1842).

The highest authority in the Beylik was the Bey of Constantine who was appointed by the Dey of Algiers, among the Ottoman and Kouloughlis especially, the Beys exercised an autonomous power in the provinces which were entrusted to them. The Bey was assisted by a number of administrators (who could also have a military role) including:

- The Khalifah: was the bey's deputy and had for functions; ensure the collection of taxes and control the Qaids. It had tribes as its prerogative and could use the militia;
- The Agha es sbaihia: had the command of the provincial troops and had a cavalry made up of the fractions of the douars around Constantine;
- The Bach katib: was a kind of secretary general who ensured the important correspondence with the Pasha of Algiers and the Sublime Porte;
- The Bach mekaheli: was the head of the bey's private guard;
- The Bach serradj: was the head of the bey's stables;
- The Bach alam: was the leader of the standard bearers;
- The Bach khazbadji: was the overseer of the money transport convoys;
- The Khodja al-khil: was in charge of the march of horses and mules.

=== Administration of Constantine ===
Constantine had truly urban authorities. There was an employee called Qaid ed-dar with "municipal" attributions, in charge of the administration and the police of the city, he had a large number of municipal officials:

- The Qaid el-Bab, collected the duties of grant and customs;
- The Qaid es-souk, controlled the markets;
- The Qaid ez-zebel, was in charge of the cleanliness;
- The Qaid el-Casba, was in charge of the city police, particularly during the night;
- The Amines or trustees of the trade corporations, were responsible for supervising the workers and settling disputes;
- The Oukil bit el-mal, administered the vacant estates for the benefit of the poor;
- The Mokkadem, was the head of the Jews;
- A Berrah, announced official decisions.

The local families played, throughout the Ottoman era, an active role and where they animated the parties which shared the city. Civil justice was exercised through the care of two Qadis, one Malekite and one Hanafite. The two Qadis, the Muftis, the Adouls, made up the Medjelés. This tribunal met every Friday and tried the most serious cases. It was chaired by the Bey or by the Qaid ed-dar.

Constantine had about a hundred religious establishments, including many mosques. Each mosque was attached by an Imam, several Talibes, a Muezzin, a Sheikh an-nadher (administrator of Habus property) and ukils or agents responsible for the management of the cult. The Sheikh al-Islam, considered the leader of the religion, who also bore the title of Amir rakb al-hajj (standard bearer of the pilgrimage caravan) is a major political and religious institution in local life, which has evolved a lot. Before the Ottoman period, it was the role of the Abdal-Muman family, then it passed to the Lefgoun family in 1572, where it remained until the colonial conquest.

=== Public Force ===
The Bey had a militia made up of Turks and Kouloughlis. It was divided into nuba service (garrison) and mahalla service (expeditionary column). The nubas were divided into 22 sefra in the cities of Constantine, Annaba, Biskra, Béjaïa, Tebessa, Jijel and Bouïra which had a total of 333 men. To compensate for this low number, the government relied on the Makhzen tribes. The zmala was the oldest and most redoubted cavalry of the Makhzen in the province, it formed a warrior tribe established in the plain of Aïn M'lila, whose chief bore the title of Qaid ez-zmala. All the other tribesmen of war were called Daïra and had for military and administrative chief the Agha ed-Daïra, installed in Constantine, however the Sheikhs were the true administrators of the tribes. In addition to these tribes, each great Sheikh or Qaid had a certain number of horsemen with him. In addition to that, the Kabyle tribes could put 15 to 20,000 infantry under arms if needed.

== Bibliography ==
- Kaddache, Mahfoud (1992). Algeria during the Ottoman period – L'Algérie durant la période Ottomane. Alger: Alger: O.P.U. ISBN 9961000994.
- Raymond, André (1987). ""The characteristics of an "average" Arab city in the 18th century. The instance of Constantine." - " Les caractéristiques d'une ville arabe "moyenne" au XVIIIe siècle. Le cas de Constantine. "". Revue de l'Occident musulman et de la Méditerranée (44): 134–147. doi:10.3406/remmm.1987.2163.
- Temimi, Abdeljelil (1973). ""The Constantine flag at the time of Hadj Ahmed, last Bey of Constantine" - " Le drapeau constantinois à l'époque de Hadj Ahmed, dernier Bey de Constantine "". Revue de l'Occident musulman et de la Méditerranée (15–16): 323–326. doi:10.3406/remmm.1973.1252.
- Juchereau de Saint-Denis, Antoine (1831). Statistical, historical, military and political considerations about the regency of Algiers - Considérations statistiques, historiques, militaires et politiques sur la régence d'Alger.
- Julien, Charles-André (1994). History of North Africa, from its origins to 1830 – Histoire de l'Afrique du Nord, des origines à 1830. p. 677-677. ISBN 978-2-228-88789-2.
