= List of works by Arthur Ashley Sykes =

This is a list of the publications of Arthur Ashley Sykes (1684–1756), an English cleric who wrote controversial pamphlets over three or four decades, arguing a latitudinarian and rationalist line, and playing a part in the Bangorian controversy.

Year	Full title	Published as (Sykes or otherwise)	Comments
1710	Some modest animadversions and reflexions upon a sermon preach'd before the Honourable House of Commons, by Dr. West, on Monday, the 30th of January: being the day appointed to be kept, as the day of the martyrdom of the blessed King Charles I. In a letter to the abovesaid Doctor	Eugenius Philalethes	Not in Disney's catalogue. A sermon of 30 January 1710 by Richard West had proved controversial in its views (pan-Protestant, Whig in its politics, and in favour of continuing the War of the Spanish Succession), and had required a vote in Parliament before it was printed.
1712	An answer to that part of Dr. Brett's sermon which relates to the incapacity of persons not episcopally ordain'd to administer Christian baptism: In a letter to the Doctor	Anonymous	The reference is to Thomas Brett.
1715	The innocency of error, asserted and vindicated	Eugenius Philalethes	Later editions in 1715 and 1729.
1715	The safety of the church under the present ministry consider'd: in a letter to —	By a clergyman
1716	An answer to the nonjurors charge of schism upon the Church of England	A Clergyman of the Church of England
1716	The external peace of the church: only attainable by a zeal for Scripture in its just latitude, and by mutual charity; not by a pretense of uniformity of opinion	By a lover of truth and peace
1716	The suspension of the Triennial Bill, the properest means to unite the nation: In a letter to —	Sykes	Sykes expressed the view that a Whig parliament was by no means guaranteed without royal help.
1716	The Thanks of an honest clergyman for Mr. Paul's speech at Tybourn, July the 13th, 1716	Sykes	Reference is to William Paul. Sykes contested Paul's claim to die as a nonjuror martyr.
1717	The difference between the Kingdom of Christ, and the kingdoms of this world: set forth in a sermon preached at the arch-deacon's visitation, in St. Michael's Church in Cambridge, December 13, 1716	Sykes
1717	A letter to a friend. In which is shewn, the inviolable nature of publick securities	By a lover of his country	Reprinted by John Ramsay McCulloch.
1717	Some remarks on Mr. Marshall's defense of our constitution in church and state. With an appendix. Containing a brief enquiry into the meaning of those words of the 20th article, the church hath - authority in controversies of faith	Sykes	The reference is to Nathaniel Marshall.
1717	A letter to the Reverend Dr. Sherlock, one of the Committee of Convocation, appointed to draw up a representation concerning the Bishop of Bangor's Preservative and sermon: Comparing the dangerous positions and doctrines contained in the Doctor's sermon, preach'd November 5th, 1712, with those charged upon the Bishop in the late report of the Committee	Sykes	To Thomas Sherlock, who answered Sykes.
1717	A second letter to the Reverend Dr. Sherlock,: being a reply to his Answer, &c. Proving the doctrines maintain'd by the doctor in his sermon Nov. 5. 1712. to be the same with those charged upon the Bishop of Bangor, as pernicious, in the late report of the Committee. With an appendix relating to a passage or two in Dr. Snape's Second letter to the Lord Bishop of Bangor	Sykes with postscript by Hoadly.	The reference is to Andrew Snape.
1717	A third letter to the Reverend Dr. Sherlock,: being an answer to his considerations offered to the Bishop of Bangor. With an appendix, in vindication of a passage in the former letter against Dr. Snape	Sykes	Sykes claimed Sherlock had not clarified the differences between what Hoadly now preached and what he (Sherlock) had preached in the past.
1718	A fourth letter to the Reverend Dr. Sherlock, being an answer to his late book, entitled, The Lord Bishop of B's defence of his assertion consider'd	Sykes	"...a tenacious, if pedantic, catalogue of charges against Sherlock of malice and misrepresenting Hoadly..."
1718	A Modest Plea for the Baptismal and Scripture-notion of the Trinity. Wherein the Schemes of the Reverend Dr Bennet and Dr Clarke are Compared. Also Two Letters	Sykes	Sykes was writing in support of Samuel Clarke's line on the Trinity, against an attack of 1718 by Thomas Bennet. in A Discourse of the Ever-Blessed Trinity in Unity (1718).
1719	The case of Dr. Bentley Regius Professor of Divinity truly stated: Wherein two late pamphlets, entituled The proceedings of the Vice-Chancellor and the University, &c. And A full and impartial account of the late proceedings, &c. are examined	Anonymous	References are to Thomas Sherlock as vice-chancellor and Conyers Middleton.
1719	The case of Dr. Bentley Regius Professor of Divinity farther stated, and vindicated. In answer to A second part of the full and impartial account of the proceedings, &c.	Anonymous
1720	The authority of the clergy and the liberties of the laity stated and vindicated. In answer to Mr. Rogers's discourse of the visible and invisible church of Christ.	Sykes	The reference is to John Rogers, who wrote Discourse of the Visible and Invisible Church of Christ in the Bangorian controversy; Rogers replied in 1722.
1721	The case of subscription to the XXXIX articles considered. Occasioned by Dr Waterland's Case of Arian subscription	Anonymous	Reference is to Daniel Waterland.
1721	A letter to the Right Honourable the Earl of Nottingham. Occasioned by a late motion made by the Archdeacon of London, at his visitation for the city clergy to return their thanks to his Lordship for his answer to Mr. Whiston	A curate of London.
1722	The consequences of the present conspiracy to the Church and State, considered, in a sermon preach'd at the Chapel in King-Street, near Golden Square, upon November 5, 1722	Sykes
1725	An essay upon the truth of the Christian religion: wherein its real foundation upon the Old Testament is shewn: Occasioned by The discourse of the grounds and reasons of the Christian religion	Sykes	Reply to Anthony Collins.
1727	The true grounds of the expectation of the Messiah. In two letters. The one printed in the London Journal, April the first, 1727. The other in vindication of it. Being a reply to the answer published at the end of a late letter to Dr. Rogers	Philalethes
1728	The duty of love to God, and to our neighbours. A sermon preach'd at the assizes held at Chelmsford in Essex, March 21. 1727-8	Sykes
1728	A sermon preach'd at the assizes held at Brentwood in Essex, August 7. 1728: Before the Right Honourable The Lord Chief Justice Eyre, and Mr. Baron Hale	Sykes	The references are to Sir Robert Eyre and Sir Bernard Hale.
1730	The true foundations of natural and reveal'd religion asserted: Being a reply to the supplement to the treatise entitul'd, The nature, obligation, &c. of the Christian sacraments	Sykes	Reply to Daniel Waterland. Thomas Johnson replied anonymously to this work and one by Thomas Chubb.
1730	A defence of the answer to the remarks upon Dr. Clarke's exposition of the church-catechism. Wherein the difference between moral and positive duties is fully stated. Being a reply to a pamphlet entitled, The nature, obligation, and efficacy of the sacraments consider'd	Anonymous	Reply to Daniel Waterland.
1730	An Answer to the Remarks Upon Dr Clarke's Exposition of the Church-Catechism	Anonymous	Reply to Daniel Waterland.
1731	An answer to the postscript of the second part of Scripture vindicated. Wherein is shewn, that if reason be not a sufficient guide in matters of religion; the bulk of mankind, for 4000 years, had no sufficient guide at all in matters of religion	Anonymous
1732	A dissertation on the eclipse mentioned by Phlegon. Or, an enquiry whether that eclipse had any relation to the darkness which happened at our Saviour's passion	Sykes	On the Crucifixion darkness and eclipse, and Phlegon of Tralles. The work was provoked by William Whiston, who related in his Memoir of Samuel Clarke how Sykes had persuaded Clarke to remove reference to the eclipse in Clarke's published Boyle Lectures; Sykes took the eclipse to be a coincidental natural event, as was the earthquake reported at the Crucifixion, an attitude (Whiston wrote) that was prejudice without proper support. Whiston first replied to Sykes in 1732.
1733	A defence of the dissertation on the eclipse mentioned by Phlegon: wherein is further shewn, that that eclipse had no relation to the darkness which happened at our Saviour's passion: and Mr. Whiston's observations are particularly considered	Sykes	The reference is to William Whiston. In A reply to Dr. Sykes's Defence of his dissertation on the eclipse mentioned by Phlegon, one of his Six Dissertations (1734) dealing with Sykes's claim, Whiston mentions the secular acceleration of the Moon, as studied by Edmond Halley; this astronomical sidelight in a theological controversy was picked up only by George Costard at the time.
1734	A second defence of the dissertation upon the eclipse mentioned by Phlegon: wherein Mr. Chapman's objections, and those of the A. of the letter to Dr. Sykes, are particularly considered	Sykes	One reply to the first work on Phlegon was anonymous (1733); the author's name has been given as Douglass. The other reference is to John Chapman, who published works in the controversy in 1734 and 1735.
1734	The reasons alledged against Dr. Rundle's promotion to the See of Glocester, seriously and dispassionately considered: in a letter to a member of Parliament for the county of —	By a gentleman of the Temple	Reply by Isaac Maddox, as "A clergyman in the country".
1735	Some further considerations on the reasons alledged against Dr. Rundle's promotion to the See of Glocester: in a second letter to a member of parliament for the County of —	A Gentleman of the Temple	The reference is to Thomas Rundle.
1736	The corporation and test acts shewn to be of no importance to the Church of England	Anonymous
1737	An enquiry into the meaning of Demoniacks in the New Testament	T.P.A.P.O.A.B.I.T.C.O.S. (i.e. The Precentor And Prebendary Of Alton-Borealis In The Church Of Sarum).	This and the sequel had a reply that has been attributed to John Swinton and George Costard. Another anonymous reply was by Thomas Church.
1737	A further enquiry into the meaning of Demoniacks in the New Testament. Wherein the enquiry is vindicated against the objections of the Revd. Mr. Twells, and of the author of The Essay in answer to it	Anonymous	The reference is to Leonard Twells. Other publications in the controversy were by Samuel Pegge and Thomas Hutchinson.
1740	Principles and connexion of natural and revealed religion distinctly considered	Sykes	On prophecy and miracles, two central topics of the apologetics of the time, it took the view that prophecy is more convincing; this position was unorthodox and was criticised.
1742	A Brief Discourse Concerning the Credibility of Miracles and Revelation: To which is added, a postscript in answer to the Lord Bishop of Lichfield's charge to his clergy	Sykes	The Bishop of Lichfield at the time was Richard Smalbroke.
1744	An examination of Mr. Warburton's account of the conduct of the antient legislators : of the double doctrine of the old philosophers, of the theocracy of the Jews, and of Sir Isaac Newton's Chronology	Sykes
1746	An enquiry how far Papists ought to be treated here as good subjects: and, how far they are chargeable with the tenets commonly imputed to them	Anonymous
1746	A Defence of the Examination of Mr. Warburton's account of the theocracy of the Jews, being an answer to his remarks, so far as they concern Dr. Sykes,...	Sykes	The title refers to William Warburton's The Divine Legation of Moses. John Towne (anonymous), supported by Warburton, attempted to cap off the controversy in 1748.
1748	An Essay on the Nature, Design, and Origin, of Sacrifices	Anonymous
1748	English liberty in some cases worse than French slavery: exemplified by animadversions upon the tyrannical and anti-constitutional power of the justices of the peace, commissioners of excise, customs, and land-tax, &c. containing methods made use of in raising the land-tax of this kingdom, compared with the Taillé and Taillon, the most oppressive in France	Anonymous, signed Philalethes
1756	The Scripture Doctrine of the Redemption of Man by Jesus Christ: In Two Parts	Sykes
1857 edition	An enquiry when the resurrection of the body, or flesh, was first inserted into the public creeds	Translated by his brother G. Sykes
