= John Chapman (theologian) =

English cleric and scholar

John Chapman (1704–1784) was an English cleric and scholar, archdeacon of Sudbury from 1741.

== Life ==
The son of the Rev. Walter Chapman, curate of Wareham, Dorset, then rector of Strathfieldsay, Hampshire, he was probably born in 1704, probably at Strathfieldsay. He was educated at Eton College, and elected to King's College, Cambridge, where he became A.B. 1727, and A. M. 1731. While tutor of his college, Charles Pratt, Jacob Bryant, and, for a short time, Horace Walpole were amongst his pupils.

Chapman became chaplain to Archbishop John Potter, and was made, in 1739, rector of Aldington, Kent, with the chapel of Smeeth; and also, rector of Saltwood in 1741. He then resigned Saltwood in 1744 to become rector of Mersham, Kent. He became archdeacon of Sudbury in 1741, and treasurer of the diocese of Chichester in 1750. He graduated by diploma D.D. at Oxford (1741). In 1743 he was a candidate for the provostship of King's College, Cambridge, but William George, who had the backing of Sir Robert Walpole, the Prime Minister, was elected by 28 votes to 10.

Chapman died at Mersham, 14 October 1784, and was buried in the chancel. His library was sold by Leigh & Sotheby, 4–14 April 1785.

== Works ==
Chapman's first work was The Objection of a late anonymous writer (i.e., Anthony Collins) against the Book of Daniel considered, Camb. 1728. This was followed by Remarks on Dr. Middleton's celebrated Letter to Dr. Waterland, Lond. 1738, of which later editions appeared. He next published Eusebius, or the True Christian's Defence, directed against Thomas Morgan's Moral Philosopher, and Matthew Tindal's Christianity as old as the Creation, in 2 vols. Lond. (1739 and 1741). William Warburton, in a letter to Philip Doddridge, criticised its slips, and said "it was written by order of the A. B. C." (Archbishop of Canterbury).

In his essay De Ætate Ciceronis Libr. de Legibus, Camb. 1741, addressed to James Tunstall, and published with his Latin epistle to Conyers Middleton, Chapman proved for the first time that Cicero had published two editions of his Academica. In 1744 his letter On the ancient numeral characters of the Roman Legions, was added to Tunstall's Observations on Epistles of Cicero and Brutus, Lond., in confutation of Middleton's notion that there were legions of the same number in different parts of the empire. In 1742 he published Miscellaneous Tracts relating to Antiquity, in five parts, Lond. In 1745 he assisted Zachary Pearce in his edition of Cicero de Officiis. In 1747 he prefixed anonymously in Latin to Richard Mounteney's edition of Demosthenes his Observationes in Commentarios vulgò Ulpianeos, and a map of ancient Greece. Editions of this work appeared in 1791, 1811, and 1820.

His other works were:

- Phlegon examined, and Phlegon re-examined, both Lond. 1739, two tracts relating to the testimonies of Phlegon of Tralles in answer to Arthur Ashley Sykes on the darkness at the crucifixion;
- Forty-five Sermons of John Berriman and William Berriman, Lond. 1745;
- Charge to the Clergy of the Archdeaconry .... Popery the true Bane of Letters, Lond. 1746, which was attacked by Middleton;
- The Jesuit Cabal further opened, Lond. 1747;
- Discovery of the Miraculous Powers of the Christian Church, Lond. 1747;
- Concio ad Synodum .... Prov. Cant., Lond. 1748;
- Ends and Uses of Charity Schools, Lond. 1752; and
- Miraculous Powers of Primitive Christians, Lond. 1752; also
- single sermons in 1739, 1743, 1748, and 1752.

== Legal case ==
As executor and surviving trustee of Archbishop Potter, Chapman presented himself to the precentorship of Lincoln (an option, or archbishop's gift). A suit was then brought in chancery by William Richardson. In 1760 Lord-keeper Henley made a decree in his favour, but the House of Lords reversed the decision. Richard Burn stated the case in Ecclesiastical Law, vol. i., but promised Chapman to modify the statement in a later edition. Richard Hurd censured Chapman in his correspondence with Warburton; and Chapman published his own statement, ‘His Case against Dr. Richardson,’ &c., Lond. 1760, which was not answered.

== Notes ==
Attribution

This article incorporates text from a publication now in the public domain: Gibson, John Westby (1887). "Chapman, John (1704-1784)". In Stephen, Leslie (ed.). Dictionary of National Biography. Vol. 10. London: Smith, Elder & Co. pp. 54–55.
