= Thomas Church =

Thomas Church may refer to:

- Thomas Church (priest) (1707–1756), English cleric and controversialist
- Thomas Church (landscape architect) (1902–1978), American landscape architect and garden designer
- Thomas Haden Church (born 1960), American actor
- Thomas Langton Church (1870–1950), Mayor of Toronto and Canadian Member of Parliament
- Thomas Church (colonial administrator) (1798–1860), British colonial administrator
- Thomas Church (MP), 16th-century member of the Parliament of England for Hereford

== See also ==
- St. Thomas Church (disambiguation)
