= Benjamin Dawson =

English minister and linguist

Benjamin Dawson (1729–1814) was an English minister, initially Presbyterian but then Anglican, and linguist.

== Life ==
The sixth son of Eli Dawson, Presbyterian minister, and brother of the scholar Abraham Dawson, he was born at Halifax. In 1746 he and his elder brother Thomas entered the dissenting academy at Kendal under Caleb Rotheram, as exhibitioners of the London Presbyterian Board. From Kendal in 1749 they went to Glasgow, remaining there four years as scholars on Dr. Daniel Williams's foundation. Benjamin defended a thesis de summo bono, on taking his M.A. degree.

In 1754 Dawson succeeded Gaskell as presbyterian minister at Leek, Staffordshire, but soon moved to Congleton, Cheshire, probably to assist in the school of Edward Harwood. Shortly afterwards he followed his brother Thomas to London, and in 1757 was assistant to Henry Read, Presbyterian minister at St. Thomas's, Southwark. Thomas conformed to the Church of England in 1758, and Benjamin followed his example.

In 1760 he was instituted to the rectory of Burgh, near Woodbridge, Suffolk, which he then held for 54 years. He still kept up relations with dissenters. In 1763, being now LL.D., he accompanied a young Yorkshire baronet, Sir James Ibbetson of Leeds, to Warrington Academy as his private tutor, and joined the literary coterie of which John Aiken was the head. He supported the Feathers' petition (1771–2) for relaxation of the conditions of subscription to the 39 Articles.

In later life Dawson turned his attention to English philology, issuing in 1806 a "prolepsis" of a new English dictionary, and a specimen of the dictionary itself. He died at Burgh on 15 June 1814, aged 85, and was buried in his chancel on 21 June. His wife, Mary, died on 22 June 1803, aged 80. A ground slab in the chancel had inscriptions to their memories.

== Views ==
In 1764 he was Lady Moyer's lecturer, and defended the doctrine of the Trinity in a novel way. Alexander Gordon writing in the Dictionary of National Biography considers that Dawson's conformity was a protest against the Arianism in fashion with the liberal Presbyterians of his time; and notes that Dawson's argument is stronger against Arianism than Socinianism. He was a pamphleteer in defence of Francis Blackburne's Confessional. In 1764 he followed Edmund Law in reducing the intermediate state to the sleep of the soul, and in 1783 he wrote strongly in refutation of the moral objections to the doctrine of necessity, against the language of the Articles. Personally he was not on good terms with Joseph Priestley, but Gordon sees Dawson as tending to the Priestley school in theology.

== Works ==
Dawson issued at least eighteen publications, including:

- Some Assistance offered to Parents with respect to the Religious Education of their Children, 1759.
- An Illustration of several Texts of Scripture, particularly those in which the Logos occurs, 1765, (substance of Lady Moyer's lecture, 1764–1765).
- Seven separate pamphlets, 1766–1769, in defence of the Confessional, against Thomas Rutherforth, John Rotheram, Gloster Ridley, Thomas Balguy, et al.
- Three separate pamphlets, 1771–3, in support of the Feathers' petition, including Free Thoughts on the subject of a farther Reformation of the Church of England, 1771.
- The Necessitarian, or the Question concerning Liberty and Necessity stated, in XIX Letters, 1783.
- Three separate sermons, Ipswich, 1780–95.
- Prolepsis Philologiæ Anglicanæ, Ipswich.
- Philologia Anglicana; or a Philological and Synonymical Dictionary of the English Language, Ipswich, 1806, pt. i. (all that was published; includes A– Adornment).

The British Museum Catalogue ascribed to him a pamphlet against necessity which belongs to John Dawson.
