= Moyer Lectures =

Annual series of theological lectures

The Moyer Lectures were an annual series of theological lectures delivered in London from 1719 to 1774, designed to support the orthodox interpretation of the Christian Trinity.

The initial lecturer was Daniel Waterland, who had much to do with the selection of lecturers in the early years. The series was endowed by the 1723 will of Rebecca Moyer, widow of the merchant Sir Samuel Moyer.

The final lecture series was given by Thomas Morell. At this point Lady Moyer's heirs exercised their option to discontinue the series.

== Lecturers ==
- 1719 Daniel Waterland
- 1720 James Knight
- 1721 William Lupton
- 1722 Edmund Chishull
- 1723 William Berriman
- 1724 Thomas Bishop
- 1725 Andrew Trebeck
- 1726 Alexander Innis
- 1727 Philip Gretton
- 1728 Henry Felton
- 1729 Joseph Trapp
- 1730 John Brown
- 1731 John Hay
- 1732 Jeremiah Seed
- 1733 Charles Wheatly
- 1734 Theodore Waterland
- 1735 Edward Underhill
- 1736 Valentine Haywood
- 1737 John Berriman
- 1738 Leonard Twells
- 1739 Arthur Bedford
- 1740 Gloster Ridley
- 1754 William Dodd
- 1757 William Clements
- 1764 Benjamin Dawson
- Peter Newcome, at the end of the series.
- 1773 Thomas Morell
