= Andrew Snape =

English cleric, academic and headmaster (1675–1742)

Andrew Snape (1675–1742) was an English cleric, academic and headmaster, provost of King's College, Cambridge, from 1719.

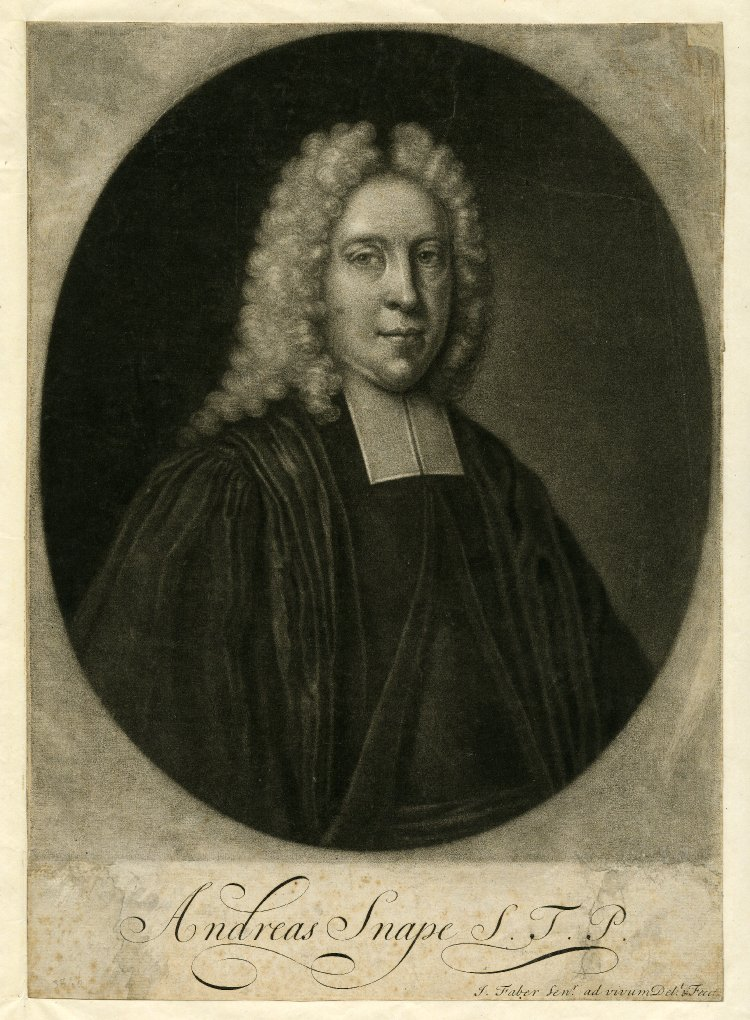
Mezzotint by John Faber the Elder. A smaller version was also published, as a portrait of Orator Henley.

== Life ==
Snape was born at Hampton Court, Middlesex, the son of Andrew Snape (the younger), serjeant farrier to Charles II, and author of The Anatomy of an Horse (1683). The son was admitted to Eton College in 1683, and was elected to a scholarship at King's College, Cambridge, in 1689. He graduated B.A. in 1693, M.A. in 1697, and was created D.D. comitiis regiis in 1705.

Snape became lecturer of St. Martin's, London, and was chaplain to Charles Seymour, 6th Duke of Somerset, chancellor of the university of Cambridge, by whom he was presented in 1706 to the rectory of the united parishes of St Mary-at-Hill and St. Andrew Hubbard. In 1707, Snape was deputed by his university to represent, on its behalf, the faculty of theology at the jubilee of the foundation of the university of Frankfurt-on-the-Oder; and during his stay on the continent he preached a sermon before the Electress Sophia. He became one of the chaplains in ordinary to Queen Anne, and held the same office under George I.

In 1711, Snape was appointed headmaster of Eton, which flourished under his management. The part that he took in the Bangorian controversy gave offence at court, and his name, like that of Thomas Sherlock, was removed from the list of king's chaplains. On the death of John Adams he was chosen provost of King's College, Cambridge, in February 1719. He was vice-chancellor of the university in 1723–4. Early in 1737 he became rector of Knebworth, Hertfordshire, but resigned the living in August of the same year, when he was presented by the chapter of Windsor to the rectory of West Ildesley, Berkshire.

Snape died in his lodgings in Windsor Castle on 30 December 1742. He was buried in the south aisle of St. George's Chapel.

== Works ==
Snape was one of the principals in the Bangorian controversy, and in numerous pamphlets he attacked the principles upheld by Benjamin Hoadly. The first of his Letters to the Bishop of Bangor passed through seventeen editions in the year of its publication, 1717.

The sermons, which he published separately, were, with additions, printed as Forty-five Sermons on several Subjects, 3 vols. London, 1745, under the editorship of John Chapman, D.D., and William Berriman, D.D. In two Spital sermons preached in 1707 and 1718 he advocated humane treatment of the mentally ill. He contributed verses to the university collections on the death of Queen Mary, the Peace of Ryswick, and the accession of Queen Anne. Snape was the editor of Robert Moss's Sermons (1732); but the preface, "by a Learned Hand", was by Zachary Grey.

== Family ==
Snape married Rebecca, widow of Sir Joshua Sharp, sheriff of London, and daughter of John Hervey, merchant, of London.

Academic offices
| Preceded by John Newborough | Head Master of Eton College; 1711–1720 | Succeeded by Henry Bland |
| Preceded by John Adams | Provost of King's College, Cambridge; 1720–1743 | Succeeded by William George |
