= La Famille =

La Famille ("The Family") is an endogamous French religious group, an offshoot of the 18th-century Convulsionnaires of Saint-Médard, which was itself part of Jansenism.

The group consists of approximately 4,000 people as of 2021, who share eight surnames, almost all of whom reside in three arrondissements in eastern Paris.

It has been the subject of investigation by MIVILUDES.
