= Arthur Ashley Sykes =

Anglican religious writer

Arthur Ashley Sykes (1684–1756) was an Anglican religious writer, known as an inveterate controversialist. Sykes was a latitudinarian of the school of Benjamin Hoadly, and a friend and student of Isaac Newton.

== Life ==
Sykes was born in London in 1683 or 1684 and educated at St. Paul's School. In 1701 he was admitted to Corpus Christi College, Cambridge, where he received a scholarship (1702), B.A. (1705), M.A. (1708), and D.D. (1726). He was vicar of Rayleigh in Essex from 1718 till his death in 1756.

In 1739 with Thomas Birch he helped George Turnbull become ordained in the Church of England.

== Controversialist ==
Sykes took part successively in many of the Anglican theological controversies of his time.

=== Trinitarian controversy ===
Sykes wrote in support of Samuel Clarke's line on the Trinity, against an attack of 1718 by Thomas Bennet, in A Discourse of the Ever-Blessed Trinity in Unity (1718).

=== Bangorian controversy ===
The sermon of Hoadly that set off the Bangorian Controversy had been anticipated by Sykes preaching in January 1717, on the same text with essentially the same theme. Sykes answered the Discourse of the Visible and Invisible Church of Christ in the controversy, by John Rogers, with his own The Authority of the Clergy and the Liberties of the Laity Stated; to which Rogers replied.

=== Bentley controversy ===
In 1718 he wrote to defend Richard Bentley in the St James's Post, who had been deprived of his degrees by Thomas Gooch acting as Vice-Chancellor of the University of Cambridge. The controversy was continued by Thomas Sherlock and Conyers Middleton.

=== Miracles and prophecy ===
Sykes made some concessions to deist criticism of the reliability of the testimony to the biblical miracles. He also restricted the scope of the miraculous, for example rejecting the reports associated to the Convulsionnaires of Saint-Médard, and the tomb of the Jansenist supporter François de Pâris. He also stated that the cures of Valentine Greatrakes were not miraculous. His doctrine of the working of the biblical miracles linked them to an active spiritual dimension of fulfilment of prophecy.

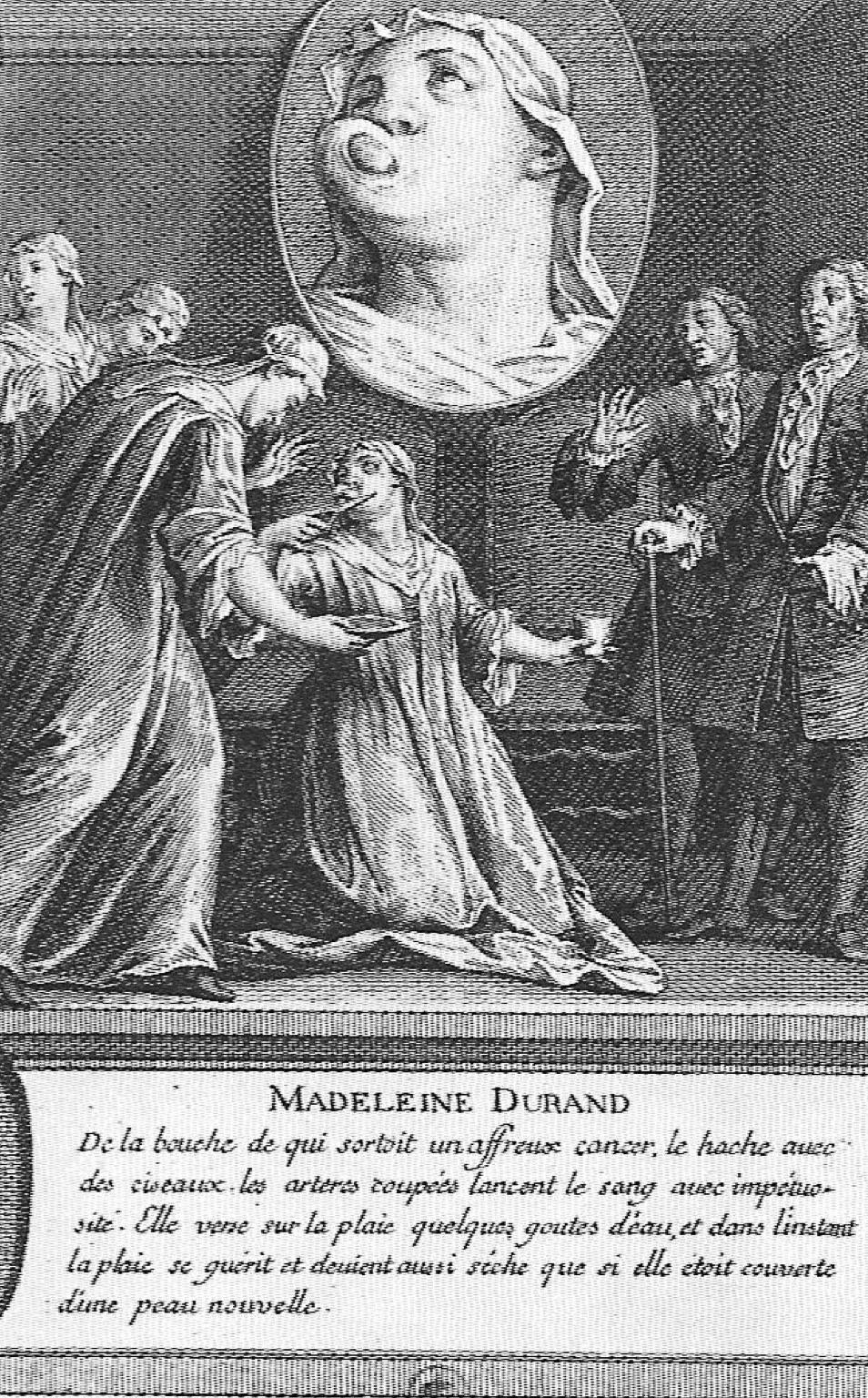
Engraving of a Jansenist cancer cure, c.1730.

=== Demoniacs and mental illness ===
In 1737 Sykes published An enquiry into the meaning of demoniacks in the New Testament, rejecting any belief in the existence of demons and regarding those possessed as simply suffering from mental illness. In this he went further than Joseph Mede's exposition of the Doctrine of Demons, as in the later work of Dr. Richard Mead. He was answered by Thomas Church, in an anonymous work of the same year.

Sykes also rejected the devil as a supernatural evil being, anticipating the allegory argument of John Epps. Two replies to this work were published in 1737 and 1738 by Leonard Twells. These works were part of a larger debate on demonology and possession, with Sykes siding with the sceptics Francis Hutcheson and Thomas Woolston, against Zachary Pearce and Richard Smalbroke.

=== Pseudonyms ===
Sykes used many pseudonyms, some of them shared with others. One, used in the book on "demoniacks", was T.P.A.P.O.A.B.I.T.C.O.S., standing for "The Precentor and Prebendary of Alton Borealis in the Church of Sarum".

== Newton papers ==
Sykes at the end of his life was passed Isaac Newton's papers on theology and chronology. He prepared a digest of the material, but found almost none of it fit for publication. The papers went next to Jeffery Ekins.
