= John Adams (Provost of King's College, Cambridge) =

English churchman

John Adams D.D. (1662–1720) was an English churchman, and provost of King's College, Cambridge.

== Life ==
John Adams was born in London, and educated at Eton College and Cambridge, where he was admitted to King's College in 1678, took the degree of B.A. in 1682, and M.A. in 1686. He afterwards travelled into Spain, Italy, France, and Ireland; and in 1687 was presented by the Lord Chancellor George Jeffries to the living of Higham in Leicestershire.

In London, he was lecturer of St Clement Danes; rector of St. Alban's Woodstreet, in the gift of Eton College; and Rector of St. Bartholomew, presented by Lord Harcourt, the chancellor. He was also a prebendary of Canterbury, chaplain in ordinary to Queen Anne, and in 1708, canon of Windsor. In 1711 he was presented to the living of Hornsey, by Henry Compton, Bishop of London; and in the following year elected Provost of King's College, a position he held until his death in 1719. He published in 1700 "An Essay on Self-Murther," a reply to John Donne's "Biathanatos," demonstrating that suicide was in no way natural to the human psyche or Divine law.

He was considered as an eloquent preacher, and often employed on public occasions. Fifteen of his sermons were printed from 1695 to 1712.

== Sources ==
Academic offices
Preceded by Charles Roderick	Provost of King's College, Cambridge; 1712-1720	Succeeded by Andrew Snape
