= Adrien Dauzats =

French painter (1804–1868)

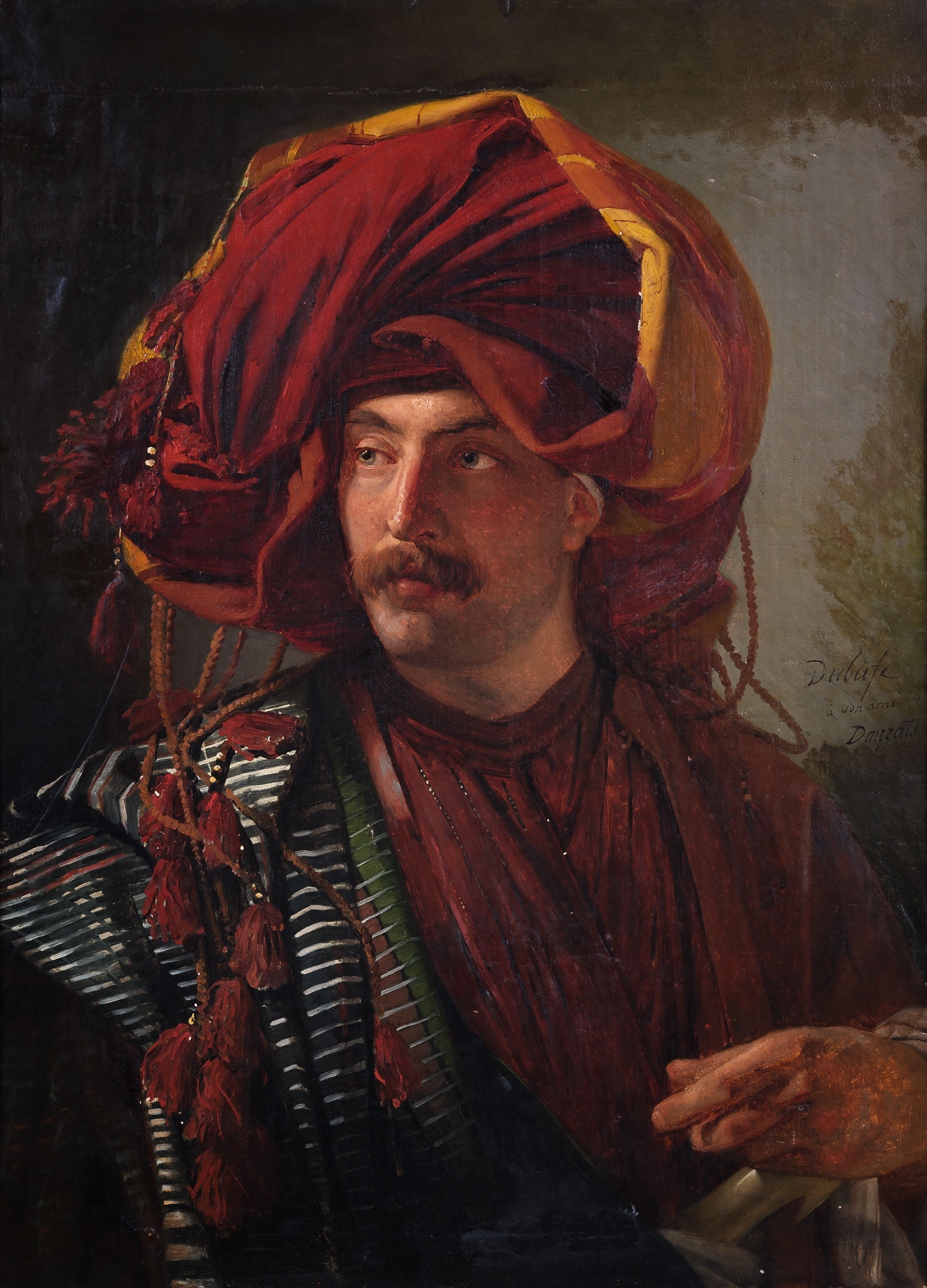
- Portrait of Dauzats by Claude-Marie Dubufe
- Born: 16 July 1804; Bordeaux, France
- Died: 18 February 1868 (63 years); Paris, France
- Education: École de Dessin
- Known for: Painter, lithographer, illustrator
- Style: French school
- Movement: Orientalist

Adrien Dauzats (16 July 1804 – 18 February 1868) was a French landscape, genre painter and painter of Oriental subject matter. He travelled extensively throughout the Ottoman Empire and illustrated a number of books for the travel writer, Baron Taylor.

== Life and career ==
Adrien Dauzats was born at Bordeaux in 1804. His father was a scenery painter at a Bordeaux theatre, and the boy grew up dreaming of becoming a scene painter. He became a pupil of Lacour at the École de Dessin. He was a frequent exhibitor at the Salon of genre subjects and interiors of churches, and was also a lithographer.

After completing his studies, in around 1829, he accompanied, Baron Taylor, a playwright, soldier and archaeologist to the Middle East and visited Egypt, Syria, Mount Sinai, Palestine and other locations, for the purpose of making illustrations for Baron Taylor's travel books, including: Voyages Pittoresques et Romantiques de l'ancienne France: 1820-63; Voyage Pittoresque en Espagne, en Portugal, et sur la côte d'Afrique, de Tanger à Tetouan: 1826-32; La Syrie, I'Egypte, la Palestine et la Judée: 1835-39, and other books.

After visiting Palestine, Syria, Mount Sinai and other locations, he began to produce works with Oriental themes. He was one of the first artists to paint the Orient "with scrupulous exactitude and impartiality." Following his second trip to the Middle East, he published a book, Quinze Jours au Sinai, which he co-authored with the novelist, Alexandre Dumas Snr, in which Dauzat's artistic vision set it apart from other Dumas works, and also separated it from most other travel books of the period.

On another trip to Spain in 1835, also with Baron Taylor, he met the engraver Pharamond Blanchard, who introduced Taylor and Dauzats to the prominent artistic de Madrazo family. Dauzats remained in Spain until 1837, met many prominent Spanish artists and developed an interest in Spanish art. During this trip (about 1839), Dauzats came to the attention of King Louis-Phillipe and accepted an invitation to accompany a military and diplomatic expedition to Algeria, with a brief to produce five watercolours of French military exploits. This was to be one of his last voyages, but he continued to paint Orientalist themes long after his travelling days were over.

In 1868, the artist accepted a commission to produce four illustrations of characters from the Arabian folktale, One Thousand and One Nights for a fixed price of 2,000 francs each. Madame Aldema, who commissioned the works, paid a 1,000 franc advance when the artist commenced the first work, Sinbad the Sailor, however, the artist died in Paris in 1868 before he could finish the work. There followed a curious litigation, where the artist's estate refused to hand over the unfinished work, on the grounds that his will had stipulated that incomplete works were not to be shown publicly. However, Madame Aldema was able to satisfy the court that the work had already been exhibited and was thus successful in taking ownership of the sketch. After his death, Dauzat's sketchbooks, notably sketches of his travels with Baron Tayor, along with artworks, including some Spanish masterpieces and his extensive library were sold in an atelier sale at the Hôtel Drouot, Paris in February 1869.

== Gallery ==
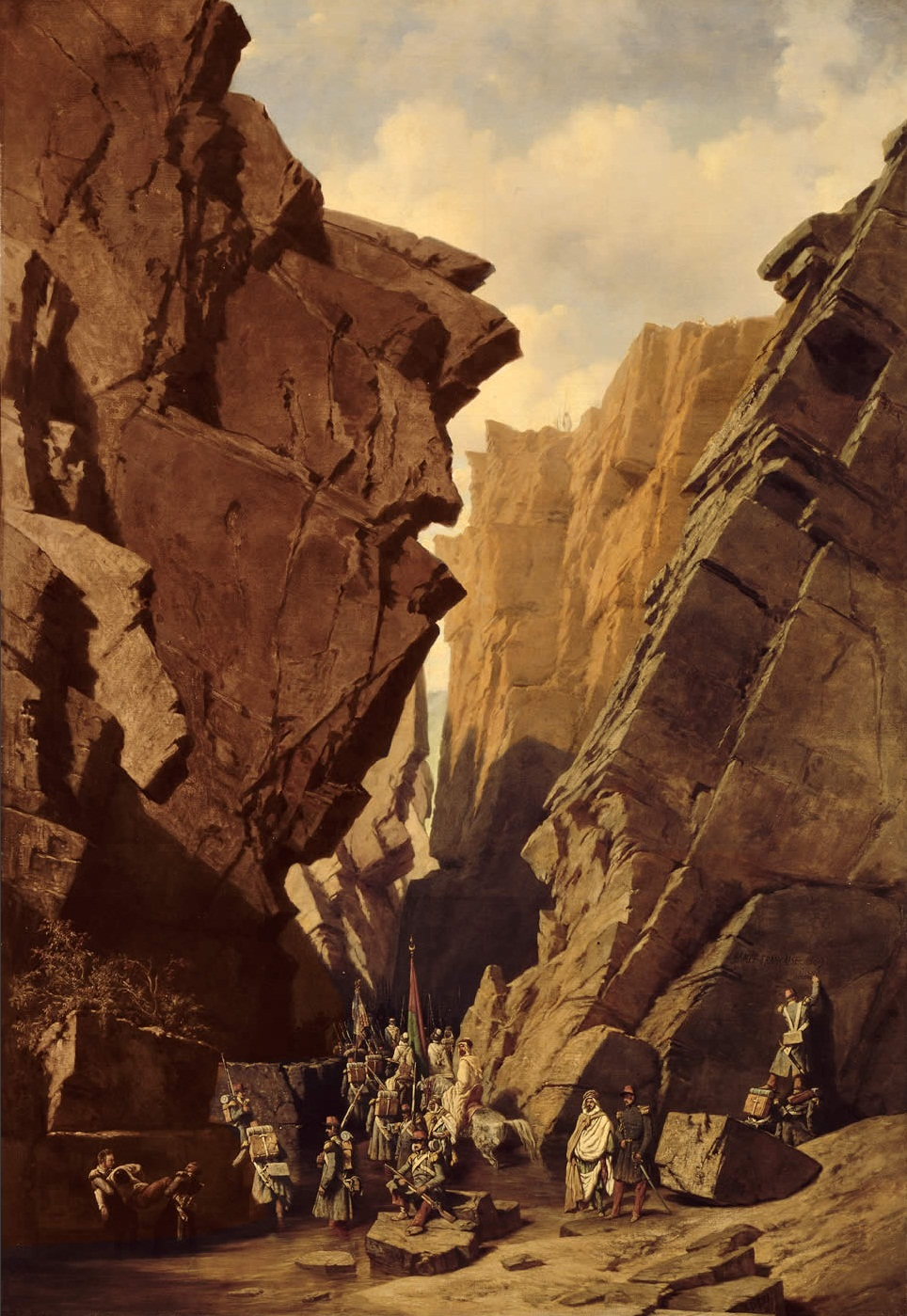
The Iron Gates Pass in Algeria, 18 October 1839, now at the Musée des Beaux-Arts d'Orléans

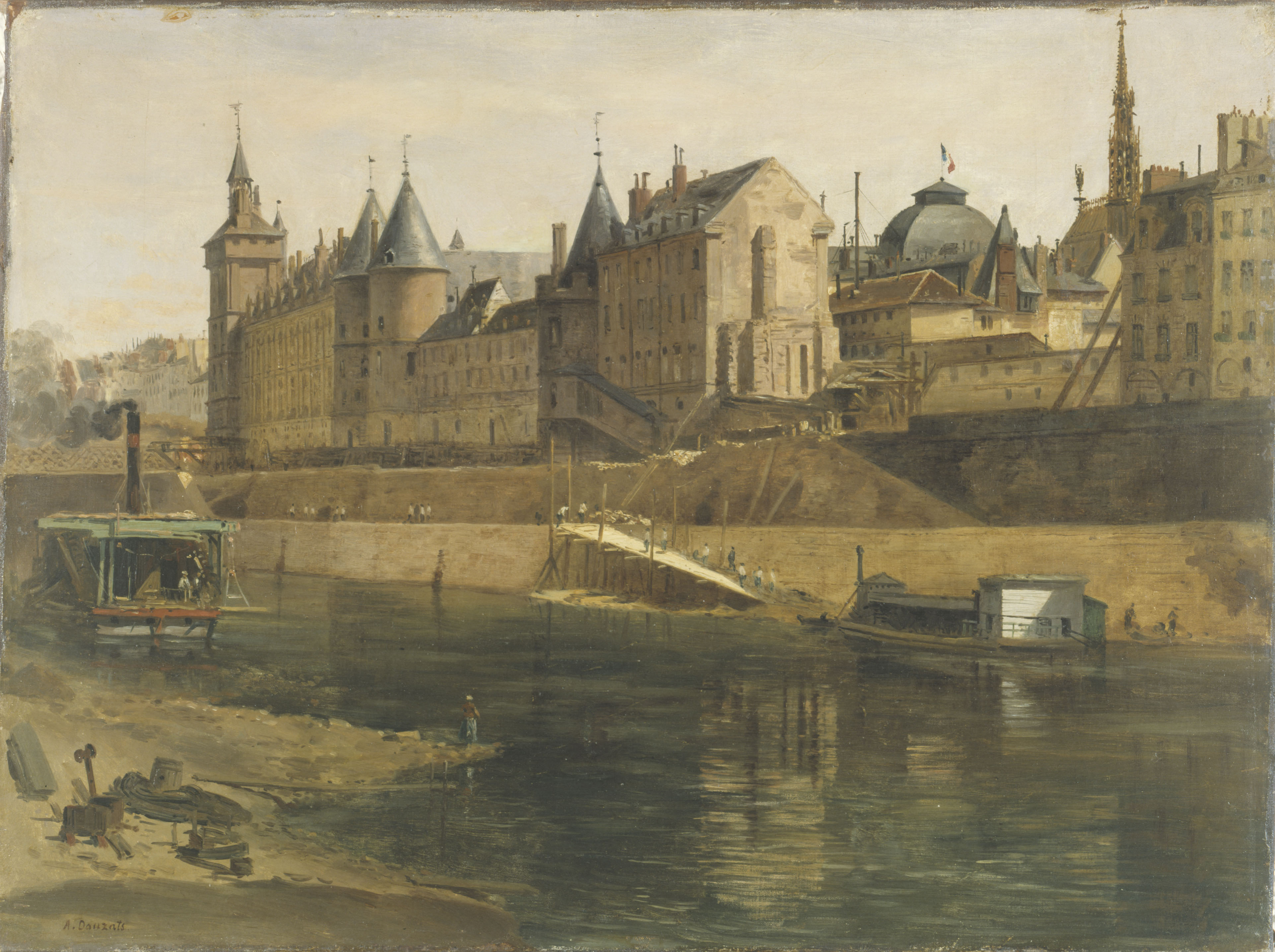
The Palais de Justice, the Conciergerie and the Tour de l'Horloge, after 1858

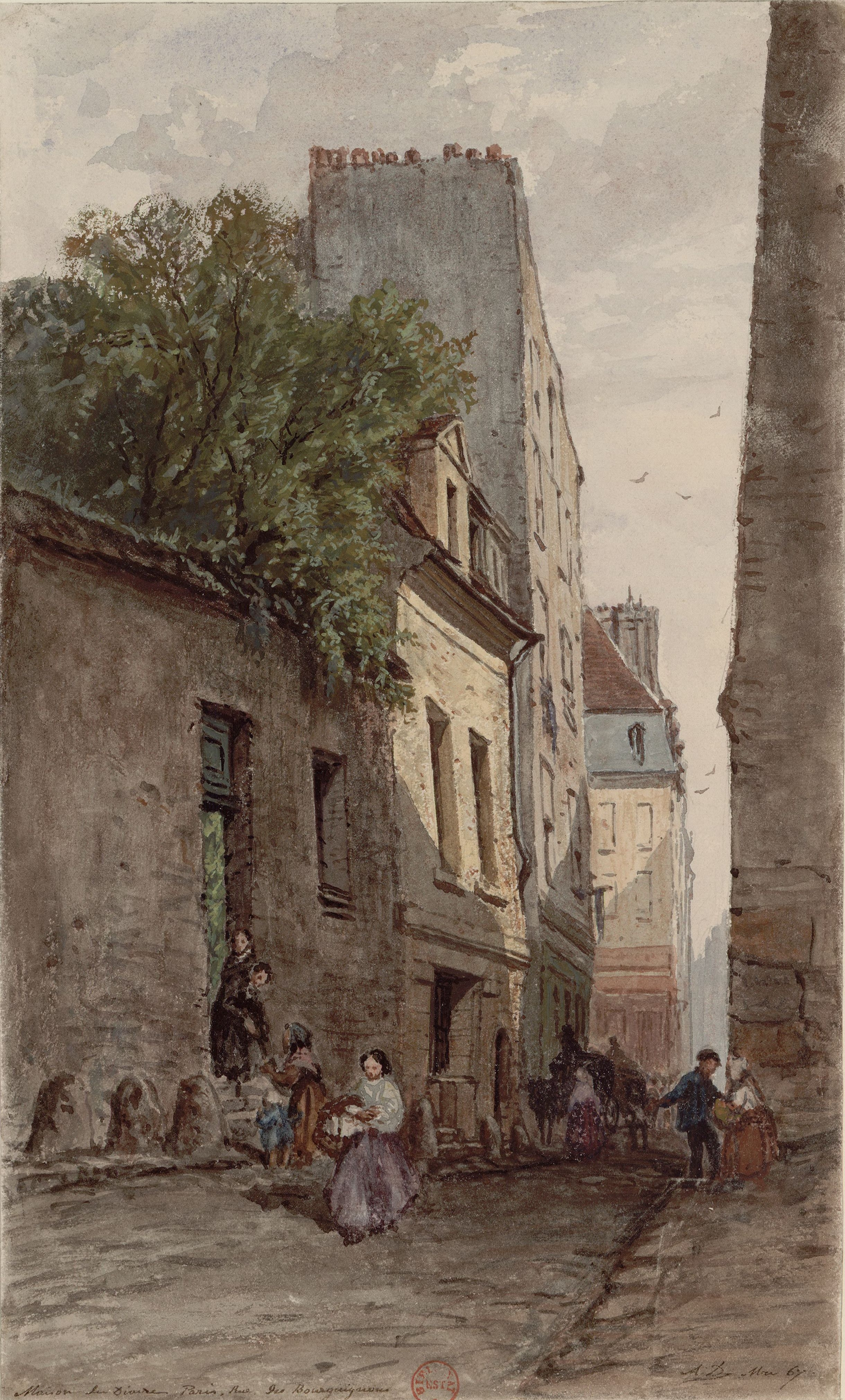
The house of deacon François de Pâris in the Rue des Bourguignons (now the Boulevard de Port-Royal): drawing from 1867

== See also ==
- List of Orientalist artists
- Orientalism
