= Peter Newcome (antiquary) =

Peter Newcome (1727–1797) was an English cleric, known as an antiquarian.

== Life ==
Born at Wellow, Hampshire, he was son of Peter Newcome (1684–1744), rector of Shenley, Hertfordshire, and grandson of Peter Newcome (1656–1738). He was educated at Newcome's School in Hackney, entered Queens' College, Cambridge on 7 November 1743, and graduated LL.B. in 1750.

Newcome was instituted rector of Shenley, on his own petition, on 23 December 1752, was collated to a prebend at Llandaff Cathedral on 15 March 1757, and to a prebend at St Asaph Cathedral on 4 May 1764. The last preferment he handed over to his brother, Henry, in 1766, on being presented to the sinecure rectory of Darowen, Montgomeryshire.

By the appointment of his friend, J. Heathcote, Newcome twice preached Lady Moyer's lectures in St Paul's Cathedral, and was (?) the last preacher on the endowment. In 1786 Sir Gilbert Heathcote gave him the rectory of Pitsea, Essex.

Newcome died unmarried in his sister's house at Hadley, near Barnet, Middlesex, on 2 April 1797.

== Works ==
Newcome was the author of:

- Maccabeis, a Latin poem, 1787.
- The History of the … Abbey of St. Alban, 1793–1795, in two volumes.

== Notes ==
Attribution

This article incorporates text from a publication now in the public domain: Lee, Sidney, ed. (1894). "Newcome, Peter". Dictionary of National Biography. Vol. 40. London: Smith, Elder & Co.
