= Glocester Ridley =

English writer

Glocester (or Gloster) Ridley (1702–1774) was an English miscellaneous writer.

== Life ==
Named Glocester after the Glocester Indiaman in which he was born at sea in 1702, he was a collateral descendant of Bishop Nicholas Ridley, and son of Matthew Ridley of Bencoolen, East Indies (now Indonesia). He was educated at Winchester College, becoming scholar in 1718, when he was described as of St. Alban, Wood Street, London. He matriculated from Trinity College, Oxford, on 14 October 1721, but was admitted a scholar of New College on 1 September 1722, becoming Fellow on 18 June 1724, before the usual two years of probation had been completed. He graduated B.C.L. on 29 April 1729, and the degree of D.D. was conferred upon him by diploma on 25 February 1767.

Ridley was ordained in the English church, and was curate to William Berriman, D.D. He was Berriman's executor, and preached his funeral sermon. In 1733, he was appointed by his college to the small benefice of Weston Longueville, Norfolk, thereby vacating his fellowship in 1734. He was also chaplain to the East India Company at Poplar, where he chiefly resided, and lecturer at St. Ann's, Middlesex; and in 1751 he was presented by his college to the donative of Romford in Essex. When the Duke of Bedford was made Lord Lieutenant of Ireland in 1756, Ridley declined an offer of the first chaplaincy, although it was coupled with a promise of promotion in England. He remained without substantial preferment until May 1766, when he was appointed to the prebendal stall of Teignton Regis in Salisbury Cathedral by Archbishop Secker.

Ridley died on 3 November 1774, and was buried on 10 November in the cemetery at Poplar, the epitaph on his monument being written by Lowth. Ridley's library was sold by Benjamin White in 1775.

== Associations ==
Ridley was known to many learned men, including Bishop Lowth and the poet Christopher Pitt. To the latter he presented a set of verses 'on his poems and translations.' To Joseph Spence, Alexander Pope's friend, he was especially close. Spence gave him Pope's cane, and made him his executor. Three letters from Ridley to Spence are in the appendix to Spence's 'Anecdotes' (1858 edition, pp. 320–7), and Ridley addressed to Spence his imitation of Horace's Ode 12, bk. iv. in Dodsley's Museum (i. 135–6). William Duncombe's translation of the second book of the Epistles of Horace is dedicated to him.

== Works ==
Ridley wrote:

- The Christian passover. Four sermons: in which the doctrine of the Lord's supper is laid down ... Preached in Lent, M.DCC.XXXVI, 1742
- Eight sermons on the divinity and operations of the Holy Ghost preached at the Cathedral of St. Paul in London: in the years 1740, 1741. Lady Moyer lectures, published 1742.
- Jovi Eleutherio, or an Offering to Liberty [anon.], 1745; this subsequently (1748) appeared in Dodsley's 'Collection of Poetry,' iii. 44–58.
- A sermon preached before the honourable Trustees for Establishing the Colony of Georgia in America, and the Associates of the late Reverend Dr. Bray at their anniversary meeting, 20 March, 1745-6. in the parish church of St. Margaret, Westminister, 1746
- Constitution in church and state. Three sermons preached on occasion of the present rebellion, at St. Ann's Limehouse, and the chapel of Poplar, in Sept. and Oct. 1745, 1746
- The good Christian never dies A sermon preached in the parish church of St. Andrew Undershaft, at the funeral of William Berriman, D.D. 10 February 1749, 1750
- God's threatnings against sinful nations exemplified, and improved A sermon preached in the chapels of Romford and Poplar, ... 1 and 8 April 1750., 1750
- The blessing of religion to civil societies. A sermon preach'd at the assizes held at Thetford, for the county of Norfolk, on Friday, 23 March 1753, 1753
- The difference and respective use of the moral, civil and ceremonial law. A sermon preach'd at the assizes held at Norwich, on Wednesday, 15 August 1753, 1753
- A sermon preached before the Sons of the Clergy in the cathedral church of St. Paul, on Thursday, 28 April 1757. By Glocester Ridley, ... To which is annexed, A list of the annual amount of the collection for this charity, from the year 1721, 1757
- A sermon preached in the parish-church of Christ-Church, London, on Thursday 5 May 1757 being the time of the yearly meeting of the children educated in the charity-schools, in and about the cities of London and Westminster, 1758
- De Syriacarum Novi Fœderis Versionum indole atque usu dissertatio, 1761, dedicated to Archbishop Secker; it is reprinted at the end of Semler's edition of J. J. Wetstein's Libelli ad crisen atque interpretationem Novi Testamenti (Halæ, 1776), p. 247. Ridley had received four manuscripts from Mesopotamia, two of which contained 'binas versiones Cyriacas Novi Fœderis tabularum,' and although he was without a preceptor, and even lacked a knowledge of the letters, he applied himself to a study of the language and learnt it. The manuscripts were left by him to New College, Oxford, and they were printed at the expense of the delegates of the Clarendon Press in 1778, by the Rev. Joseph White, D.D.
- Life of Bishop Nicholas Ridley, 1763; the success of this volume enabled him to invest 800l. in the funds; the greater part of it was reprinted in 'The Voice of the Church,' 1840, vols. i. ii.
- A Review of Mr. Phillips's History of the Life of Reginald Pole, 1766.
- A Letter to the Author of the Confessional [anon.], 1768; this was followed in the same year by second and third letters, and all three, in which Archbishop Secker assisted, were bound up together with a general title. Francis Blackburne, the anonymous author of The Confessional, subsequently replied to them, and so did "A Country Clergyman" (said to be Thomas Gwatkin).
- Melampus: a Poem in Four Books, with Notes, by the late Gloster Ridley, 1781. On the title-page is a medallion portrait of the author, painted by Scoule, and engraved by John Hall. Prefixed is Ridley's poem of ‘Psyche,’ which had previously appeared in Dodsley's ‘Museum’ (iii. 80–97) and in Dodsley's ‘Collection of Poetry’ (iii. 33–43). The publication was effected by George Steevens for the benefit of Ridley's widow and family.

Some of his poems, including one on the death of George I and on the accession of George II from the Oxford set of verses on those events, appear in Nichols's ‘Collection of Poems’ (viii. 74–82, 112–34).

While young Ridley was fond of acting, and in 1728 he and four companions wrote the tragedy of The Fruitless Redress, each of them contributing an act. He afterwards composed the play of Jugurtha, but neither piece was produced on the public stage or printed. Theophilus Cibber, his contemporary at Winchester, is said to have called upon him at Poplar, and to have pressed him to adopt the stage as his profession. Verses and translations by him, apparently written while he was at college, are in the British Museum.

== Family ==
Ridley left a widow and four daughters. In his old age he lost a daughter, Judith Elisabeth Ridley, and both his sons, James Ridley and Thomas Ridley, a writer in the service of the East India Company at Madras, where he was no sooner settled than he died of smallpox. His daughter Mary (d. 1809), wife of Edward Evans (d. 1807), captain in the 23rd Foot, is said to have written several novels. Margaret Ridley, 'the last survivor of his family,' died at Hingham, Norfolk in 1837, aged 91.
