= Henry Felton (clergyman) =

English clergyman and academic

Henry Felton D.D. (1679–1740) was an English clergyman and academic.

== Life ==
Felton was born in the London parish of St Martin-in-the-Fields on 3 February 1679. His earliest education was at Cheney's School in Buckinghamshire; he moved to Westminster School under Richard Busby, and then to Charterhouse School, where he became a private pupil of Dr. Thomas Walker, the head-master. He entered St Edmund Hall, Oxford, where John Mill was then principal, and where he had for his tutor Thomas Mills, later bishop of Waterford. He proceeded to his degree, taking his M.A. in June 1702; and in December of the same year was ordained deacon in the Chapel Royal, Whitehall, by William Lloyd, bishop of Worcester. In June 1704 he was admitted to priest's orders by Henry Compton, bishop of London. According to Thomas Hearne he then left the university and became a preacher in and about London.

In 1708 Felton undertook the care of the English church at Amsterdam, but returned to England in the following year, and became domestic chaplain to John Manners, 1st Duke of Rutland, an office which he retained under three successive dukes. On 11 July 1709 he took the degree of B.D. In 1711 he was presented to the rectory of Whitwell in Derbyshire by John Manners, 2nd Duke of Rutland. On 5 July 1712 he proceeded to the degree of D.D. On 20 April 1722 he was elected principal of St Edmund Hall.

In 1736 Felton's patron and former pupil John Manners, 3rd Duke of Rutland, then Chancellor of the Duchy of Lancaster, presented him to the rectory of Barwick-in-Elmet, Yorkshire. He died on 1 March 1740, and was buried in the chancel of the church of Barwick.

== Works ==
On 7 July 1706 Hearne heard a sermon delivered by Felton at St Mary's on an Act-Sunday; and added that "Mr. Felton lately put out a sixpenny pamphlet against the presbyterians of Colebrooke." This pamphlet, Felton's first publication, may have appeared in the early part of 1706. In 1711 he published his Dissertation on Reading the Classics, and forming a just Style, a work that he had written for his pupil, John, Lord Roos, later the 3rd Duke of Rutland. It was popular in its day, and passed through several editions.

In 1725 Felton preached before the university on Easter day a sermon on The Resurrection of the same numerical body, and its reunion to the same soul, against Mr. Locke's notion of personality and identity. This sermon went through three editions, the last of which was in 1733, in which year he preached a second on the‘Universality and Order of the Resurrection, being a Sequel to that wherein the Personal Identity is asserted; it was dedicated to Richard Smalbroke. In 1727 he issued a tract entitled The Common People taught to defend their Communion with the Church of England against the attempts and insinuations of Popish emissaries. In a Dialogue between a Popish Priest and a Plain Countryman. In 1730 appeared the Character of a Good Prince. A Sermon before the University of Oxford, 11 June 1730, being the day of His Majesty's Inauguration.

In 1728–9 he preached the Lady Moyer lectures at St Paul's, which he published at Oxford in 1732, under the title of The Christian Faith asserted against Deists, Arians, and Socinians, &c. To which is prefixed a very large Preface concerning the Light and Law of Nature, and the Expediency and Necessity of Revelation. This, his major work, was dedicated to Edmund Gibson, bishop of London. In 1735 he published at Oxford The Scripture Doctrine of the Resurrection as it stood before the Law, and in 1736 The Scripture Doctrine in the Books of Moses and Job.

His son, the Rev. William Felton, in 1748 published a set of his sermons, on the creation, fall, redemption, and other topics. They had been preached in Whitwell and Barwick churches. William Felton prefixed a sketch of his father's life and character.
