= Iron Gates (Algeria) =

Mountain pass in Algeria

- Biban
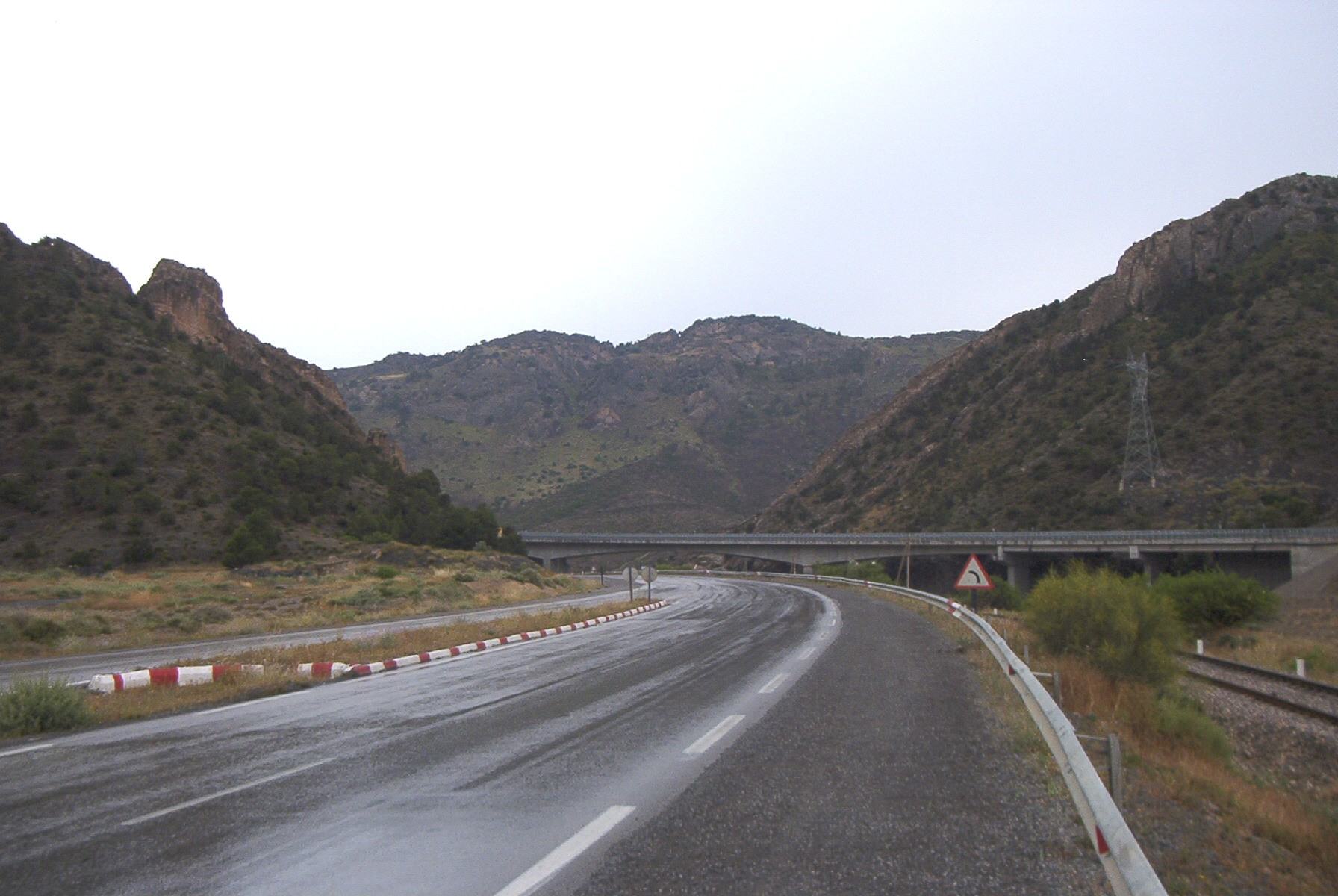
- View of the Iron Gates.

- Location within Algeria
- Elevation: 1,050 metres (3,440 ft)

Third Approach
- Location: Algeria
- Range: Bibans, Tell Atlas
- Coordinates: 36°05′04″N 4°35′19″E

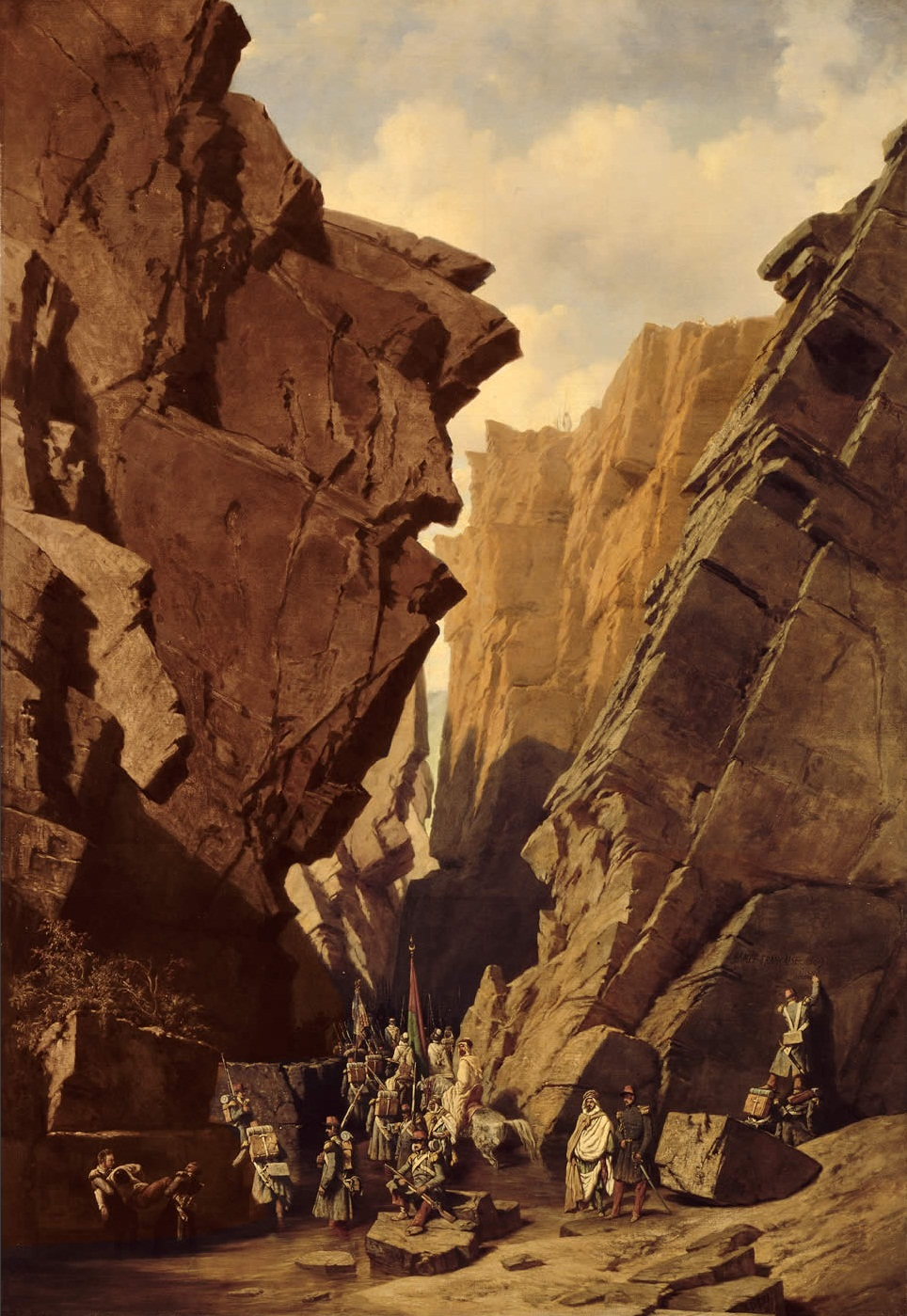
"The Iron Gates Pass in Algeria, 18 October 1839", by Adrien Dauzats.

The Iron Gates (Arabic: البيبان, known in French as Défilé des Bibans or Porte de Fer) are a mountain pass in the Bibans in Algeria. They gave their name to the Biban Range.

== History ==
An 1839 French expedition under General Valée and the duc d'Orléans disregarded the clauses of the 1837 Treaty of Tafna with emir Abd el-Kader by passing through them, reigniting the war between France and Abd el-Kader's Islamic sovereignty.
