= City Grammar School, Salisbury =

Former school in Salisbury, England

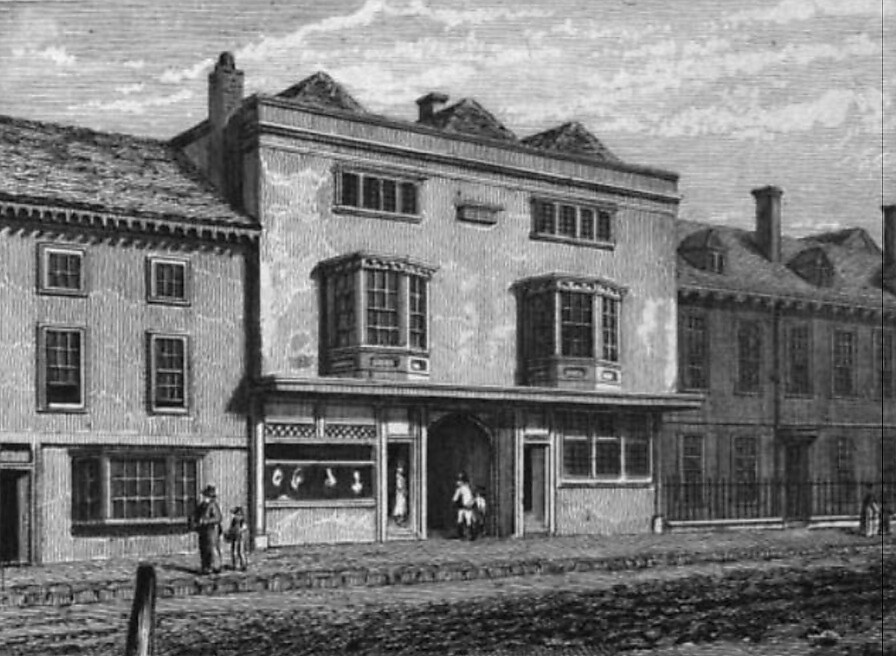
- City Grammar School, Salisbury, 1827
- Salisbury, Wiltshire; England

Information
- School type: Grammar school
- Established: 1546
- Closed: 1865
- Gender: Boys

The City Grammar School, Salisbury, was an English grammar school for boys in Salisbury, Wiltshire, England, which was founded in 1546 and closed in 1865.

Also called the City School, the name distinguished it from the Close School, now called Salisbury Cathedral School.

== History ==
The school was founded in 1546 by the Corporation of Salisbury, as the result of the Bishop of Salisbury moving the Chancellor's Grammar School into the Cathedral Close. Parliament was given erroneous information about the situation in Bradford on Avon and Trowbridge, and Salisbury obtained funds from the grammar schools in those towns, which closed. With the authority of Queen Elizabeth I, the school was endowed with an income of £26 1s. 8d. a year, paid to the schoolmaster by the Exchequer, through the Mayor of Salisbury. The Mayor and Corporation of the city were Patrons of the school. The attendance at the school of Simon Forman means that it was in operation by 1561.

The school's early home was in George Street, Salisbury. In 1608, it was at the George Inn, but in 1624 it moved into its own premises in Castle Street.

By the early 19th century, the Master's income had been supplemented by the Lectureship of St Thomas, worth £25 a year, founded by the Eyers family.

In 1818, Nicholas Carlisle reported that the school was open to boys of the city on the recommendation of the Mayor, without any limitation of numbers, although at that time there were rarely more than three on the foundation. The school was also open to other boys, and there was no fixed age of entry or leaving. There was only one schoolmaster, the Rev. Charles H. Hodgson, who took in boarders at £40 a year. He used the Eton system of education, with Greek and Latin grammars.

In 1855, there were only seven boys in the school, and the master was only visiting it once or twice a week. He resigned in 1864, when there were only three boys remaining, and the school was closed in 1865.

== Notable former pupils ==
- Simon Forman, astrologer
- Thomas Bennet, clergyman
- Robert Eyre, Chief Baron of the Exchequer
