= Nathaniel Marshall =

English churchman and theologian

Nathaniel Marshall (died 1730) was an English churchman and theologian. His views were high church and cessationist, and he was a strong opponent of the nonjurors.

== Life ==
He was son of John Marshall, rector of St George, Bloomsbury, and entered as a pensioner of Emmanuel College, Cambridge, 8 July 1696. He was admitted to the degree of LL.B. in 1702, and afterwards took holy orders, as deacon in 1705 and priest in 1705.

In 1712 he preached before the Sons of the Clergy. He was lecturer at Aldermanbury Church, and curate of Kentish Town in January 1715, when, at the recommendation of the Prince of Wales, who admired his preaching, he was appointed one of the king's chaplains. On 26 March 1716 he became rector of the united parishes of St. Vedast, Foster Lane, and St. Michaelle-Querne, in the city of London); and in 1717 he was created D.D. at Cambridge by royal mandate. He was appointed canon of Windsor by patent dated 1 May 1722. He was also lecturer of the united parishes of St. Laurence Jewry and St. Martin, Ironmonger Lane. He died on 5 February 1730, and was buried at St. Pancras.

By his wife Margaret he had eight children, the eldest of whom was in 1730 rector of St John the Evangelist Friday Street.

== Works ==
His publications are:

- 'The Penitential Discipline of the Primitive Church, for the first 400 Years after Christ: together with its Declension from the Fifth Century, downwards to its Present State, impartially represented, by a Presbyter of the Church of England,' London, 1714; reprinted in the Library of Anglo-Catholic Theology, Oxford, 1844.
- 'A Defence of our Constitution in Church and State: or an Answer to the late Charge of the Non-Jurors, accusing us of Heresy and Schism, Perjury and Treason,' London, 1717,. 'Some Remarks' on this work, by Arthur Ashley Sykes, appeared in 1717; a 'Short Answer' is appended to Matthew Barbery's 'Admonition to Dr. Kennet,' 1717; and Hilkiah Bedford published, anonymously, 'A Vindication of the late Archbishop Sancroft and of ... the rest of the Depriv'd Bishops from the Reflections of Mr. Marshal in his Defence, &c., ' London, 1717.
- 'The Genuine Works of St. Cyprian, with his Life, written by his own Deacon Pontius: all done into English from the Oxford edition, and illustrated with notes. To which is added, a Dissertation upon the case of heretical and schismatical Baptisms at the close of the Council of Carthage in 256; whose Acts are herewith published,' 2 parts, London, 1717.
- 'Sermons on Several Occasions,' 3 vols. London, 1731, published by subscription by his widow, with a dedication to the queen. An additional volume was published by the Rev. T. Archer, M.A., from the author's original manuscripts, London, 1750.

Of Marshall's separately published sermons, one entitled The Royal Pattern, on the death of Queen Anne, passed through five editions in 1714; his funeral sermon on Richard Blundel, surgeon, 1718, is reprinted in John Wilford's Memorials and Characters; and his sermon on the death of John Rogers, 1729, elicited Some Remarks from 'Philalethes.'
