= Convulsionnaires of Saint-Médard =

Group of 18th-century French religious pilgrims who exhibited convulsions

The Convulsionnaires (or Convulsionaries) of Saint-Médard were a group of 18th-century French religious pilgrims who exhibited convulsions and later constituted a religious sect and a political movement. This practice originated at the tomb of François de Pâris, an ascetic Jansenist deacon who was buried at the cemetery of the parish of Saint-Médard, Paris. The convulsionnaires were associated with the Jansenist movement, which became more politically active after the papal bull Unigenitus officially declared it heretical and banned it.

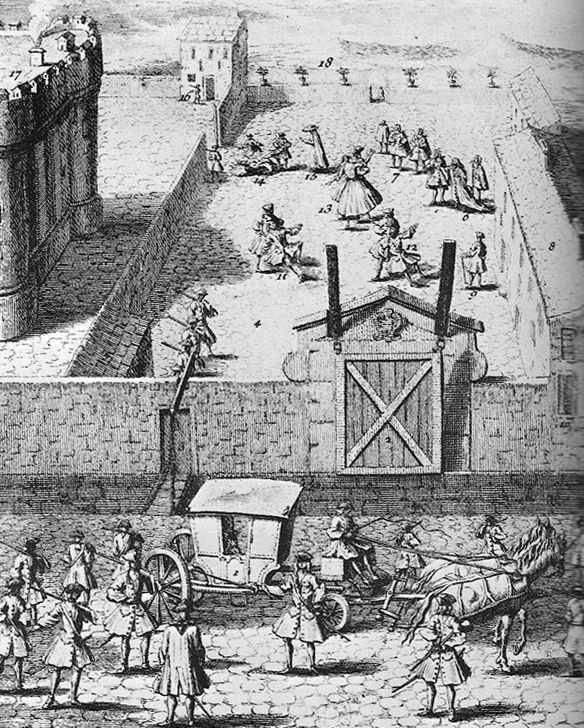
Convulsionnaires confined to the Bastille, 18th-century engraving.

The connection between the larger French Jansenist movement and the smaller, more radical convulsionnaire phenomenon is difficult to state with precision. As historian Brian E. Strayer has noted, almost all of the convulsionnaires were Jansenists, but very few Jansenists embraced the convulsionnaires.

== The Jansenist context ==
Jansenism was a religious movement and theology which arose simultaneously in northern France and Flanders in the mid-17th century. It was named for the Dutch theologian Cornelius Jansen, the Bishop of Ypres from 1635 to 1638. Jansen and his friend, l'abbe de Saint-Cyran, are generally considered the fathers of the movement. After Jansen died in 1638, his book Augustinus was published in 1640–41. As the title indicates, Jansen intended for his theology to closely follow that of Augustine of Hippo. In the 1640s, Antoine Arnauld, a disciple of Saint-Cyran, became one of the leading French defenders of Jansenist theology against the attacks of other theologians, including Jesuit theologians who endorsed Molinism. Pope Innocent X condemned Jansenism as a heresy in 1653, and Arnauld was expelled from the Sorbonne in 1655. Nonetheless, the movement continued to exist through the 18th century. Socially, Jansenism was largely an urban phenomenon.

In keeping with St. Augustine's influence, Jansenist theology presented a strong contrast between the original perfection of the Creation and the tragic, sinful state of humanity which followed after original sin. It emphasized fallen humanity's alienation from God, and asserted the necessity of God's "efficient grace" in order to avoid damnation. In painting such a stark contrast, Jansenist theology offered a kind of predestination and appeared to its critics as a denial of human free will. Jansenist writers including Blaise Pascal frequently criticized the Molinist position, which placed more emphasis on free will. The early well-spring of Jansenist theology in Paris came undoubtedly from the convents and schools at Port-Royal-des-Champs near Paris, which was ultimately razed in 1708 because of its association with Jansenism.

Despite some theological similarities to Calvinism, Jansenism maintained several other orthodox Catholic positions. Historian Dale Van Kley has written that for Jansenists, "no sin would be more heinous in their eyes than that of schism." Jansenist authors frequently criticized Calvinist theology in order to maintain their own Catholic orthodoxy. Also, unlike Calvinists, Jansenists accepted - even relished - the existence of relics and miracles. The miracle, they believed, was a powerful historical event in which God's grace, normally hidden, could be revealed.

=== Unigenitus ===
Unigenitus was a Papal bull which was promulgated by Pope Clement XI in 1713 at the request of Louis XIV. Louis had solicited the bull in the hope that it would provide a solution to the continuing Jansenist problem in France. In particular, the bull was provoked by the Jansenist theologian Pasquier Quesnel and his book Réflexions morales sur le Nouveau Testament. Unigenitus condemned many of Quesnel's propositions as heretical. It called attention to similarities between Jansenist theology and Calvinism. It also criticized the Jansenists for subverting the Church hierarchy by exalting the religious role of the laity and the lower clergy.

A large controversy ensued. At least 200 books and pamphlets were published in 1714 alone, either in support of or against the bull. By 1730, there had been over 1000 publications on the subject. In March 1717, four Jansenist bishops formally appealed Unigenitus at the Sorbonne. By March 1719, these appelants had the support of the theological faculties at the Universities of Paris, Rheims and Nantes, as well as many other prominent clergy, most notably Louis Antoine de Noailles, the Archbishop of Paris. All told, 10% of France's clergy supported the appeal, including 75% of Paris's parish priests. This included 30 French bishops and roughly 3000 priests.

Many of the clergy did not simply oppose Unigenitus out of sympathy for Jansenism. There was also a concern that the bull would increase papal and monarchical influence over the Catholic Church in France, which operated with a good deal of autonomy in this period.

By 1730, the controversy had reached a boiling point. Cardinal André-Hercule de Fleury and the new Archbishop of Paris, Charles-Gaspard-Guillaume de Vintimille du Luc had closed one seminary (Saint Magloire) that was strongly Jansenist, and had begun to summarily replace Jansenist principals and regents at other colleges. They exiled some of Paris' Jansenist priests, and exiled others. The Jansenists, for their part, had begun to publish a journal, called Nouvelles Ecclesiastiques, in 1727. The journal frequently indicted 'despotism' in both Church and State. They made an explicit appeal to the "public," writing that such an appeal to public opinion was the only road left to them.

=== François de Pâris ===
François de Pâris (1690–1727) was a Parisian Jansenist and a popular religious ascetic whose tomb in the parish cemetery at Saint-Médard gave rise to the convulsionnaire phenomenon.

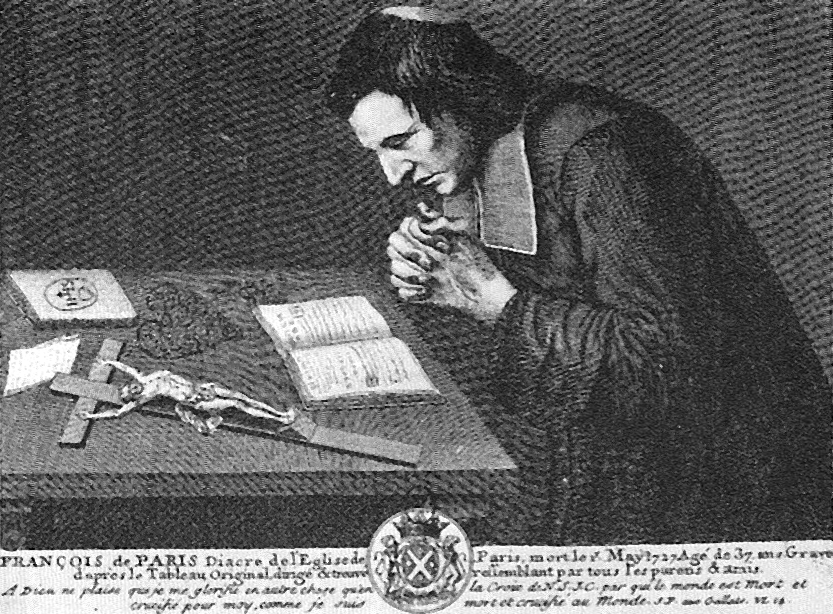
François de Pâris at prayer.

Pâris was born into a wealthy Parisian family. According to biographies published after his death, he was tutored as a young boy by Augustinians at Nanterre. Originally destined for a career in law, he went against his father's wishes and chose a career in the Church instead. After his face was horribly scarred by smallpox at age 22, he transferred to the seminary at Saint-Magloire, which was nearly dominated by Jansenists. In 1713, he gave up his annual family pension to the poor. After his parents died in 1723, he sold his family's property, gave the money to the poor, and went to live as a hermit in the poor neighbourhood of Saint-Marceau. He modeled himself after St. Francis and was apparently considered a local Saint by many.

An active appelant, Pâris protested Unigenitus in 1720, calling it "the work of the Devil."

During the final years of his life, Pâris became increasingly reclusive, and his ascetic lifestyle became increasingly severe, and he practised self-flagellation:

His bare feet became cut and bruised from walking on the paving stones ... He slept on an old armoire, covered himself with a sheet bristling with iron wires that tore his flesh ... He wore a hair shirt, a spiked metal belt, and a chain around his right arm. He beat himself with an iron-tipped lash until the blood ran down his back. He lit no fire for warmth even during the coldest winter days.

Only 36 years old, Pâris died on 1 May 1727. Large numbers of people from across the social spectrum, including the Cardinal Archbishop Noailles, came to attend his funeral in the small chapel at Saint-Médard. During the funeral and after, people began to collect snippets of hair and fingernails, splinters of wood from his casket or furniture, soil from his gravesite, and other souvenirs which might serve as holy relics. Shortly after the funeral, his tomb became the site of religious pilgrimages. His admirers composed hymns and self-styled hagiographies praising the late deacon as a saint. Many of the city's prominent Jansenists wanted Pâris to be made into a saint, and Cardinal Noailles even began the process of beatification.

== Miracles and Convulsionnaires ==
Pilgrimages to the tomb of Pâris continued over the years 1727–1730. During this period, roughly a dozen pilgrims declared that they had been miraculously cured at the tomb. This number of miracle cures exploded in 1731. Over 70 cures were announced that year, from a variety of ailments which included paralysis, cancer, and blindness, among others. Not surprisingly, the number of pilgrims also grew rapidly during the summer of 1731. Miracles were not necessarily unusual in this period, but the connection with Jansenism was considered a cause for suspicion.

=== Convulsionnaire practices ===
While the first recorded case of convulsions at the tomb of Pâris occurred in July 1731, one of the best recorded early cases is that of l'abbé de Bescherand, who made two daily pilgrimages to the cemetery: During these visits, Strayer writes, "his body was wracked by convulsions that lifted him into the air, his face was contorted by grimaces, and foaming at the mouth, he yelled and screamed for hours on end." A number of other pilgrims began to exhibit similar convulsions, and the convulsion phenomenon began to rival and eclipse the miracle phenomenon. The cemetery's atmosphere became busy and noisy as people variously prayed, sang and convulsed. Rumours spread through Paris that people were speaking in tongues, stomping on Bibles, barking like dogs, swallowing glass or hot coals, or dancing until they collapsed.

After the closure of the cemetery in early 1732, the convulsionnaires continued to gather outside the gates. They were driven further underground in 1733, and began to assemble in private homes in Paris and in other French cities such as Nantes and Troyes. As a possible parallel to the contemporary Parisian salon, women often hosted the meetings while men preached. Social class was largely ignored, and nobility and clergy were sometimes present. Many of the convulsionnaires began to live an austere and ascetic lifestyle in cooperatives, referring to each other as 'brother' or 'sister' and taking new names, usually from the Bible.

Just like their saintly Pâris, the convulsionnaires appear to have regarded the body with increasing contempt as the movement evolved through the 1730s. They began the practice of secours (release), which involved the violent beating of the individual who was experiencing the convulsions. The secours was intended to release the individual from the painful experience of the convulsions, while simultaneously symbolizing the pain of persecution. They viewed the body with disgust as the site of disease, sinfulness and corruption. Eighty convulsionnaires were arrested in 1736 for beating and cutting each other. They also began to practice regular crucifixions—with nails—to further connect their suffering to that of Jesus Christ and the early Christian martyrs. Brian E. Strayer argues that the movement descended into sadomasochism from 1740 onward; the torture became increasingly brutal while the spiritual content decreased.

=== Gender analysis ===
Gender analysis has revealed a predominance of unmarried women and girls experiencing convulsions. Catherine Maire has demonstrated that of 116 people who claimed miraculous healing at Pâris's tomb, 70% were women, and the majority of these were celibate or widowed. Of an estimated 270 people experiencing or observing convulsions in 1732, 211 were women and only 59 were men. Women made up 90% of the convulsionnaires arrested between 1732 and 1774, and a smaller majority (55%) of the convulsionnaires imprisoned at the Bastille in particular between 1715 and 1774 were women. This 55% female majority, however, is in sharp contrast the strong male majority (82%) of Jansenists imprisoned at the Bastille during the same period.

Other sources reinforces this view. In 1732, a visitor from another parish was quick to note that the convulsions were predominant among women. The robe de convulsionnaire was invented to facilitate the convulsions for women. The reports of police spies referred to the female convulsionaries as prostitutes who allowed others to beat and torture their half-naked writhing bodies. Philippe Hecquet, a Jansenist physician who sought to distance Jansenism from the convulsionnaires, claimed that female biology and moral inferiority were the causes of the convulsions. By contrast, defenders of the convulsionnaires tended to minimize the role of women and emphasize the social diversity of the movement.

Countesses, duchesses, and members of the Parlement of Paris, including the President Charles-Robert Boutin, came to observe the miracles at Saint-Médard in 1731. Certain members of the nobility did continue to attend private convulsionnaire meetings through the 1730s, including the brother of Voltaire. By and large, however, the dominant element among the convulsionnaire movement appears to have been lower-class women who were "assisted" by the lower male clergy. Daniel Vidal's study of convulsionnaires found the majority (60%) to be women, of which the largest portion (43%) came from the lower classes. By contrast, men comprised 78% of those who assisted the convulsionnaires, and nearly half of those were members of the clergy. Catherine Maire's study also made note of this predominance of male clergy.

=== Convulsionnaire prophecy and apocalypticism ===
As the historian B. Robert Kreiser has noted, the themes of persecution, martyrdom, apocalypticism and millenarianism, pervaded the "mental universe" of the convulsionnaire movement. Prophetic dreams and visions were common among its adherents, along with appeals to God's divine judgment and wrath.

Broader Jansenist theology encouraged a certain degree of individual conscience among the laity. It allowed for the possibility that a bishop could be wrong about a matter of religious truth, while a lowly priest could be right. Therefore, it allowed for the possibility of resistance to the higher clergy. The convulsionnaires took this belief even further. They identified themselves as God's persecuted faithful and compared themselves to the early Christians persecuted by the Roman Empire. Prophetic and apocalyptic speeches, often preached by illiterate artisans or women, railed against the apostasy of the Church hierarchy and prophesied the destruction of Babylon.

The convulsionnaires left behind thousands of written works, including prayers, visions, parables, dialogues, letters, songs and poems. Strayer identifies three common themes in their writing: eschatology (their theology of the end-times), word games, and their relationship to the French Monarchy. Their eschatology was particularly concerned with the conversion of the Jews to Christianity, which they believed to be imminent. The abbé Vaillant, a convulsionnaire leader who called himself 'Elijah' after the prophet who would accompany the Messiah, was deeply concerned with converting the Jews to Christianity and predicted that the end of the world would come in 1733. He was arrested in 1734 and imprisoned until his death in 1761.

Their perception to the Monarchy appears to have been variable, but generally unfavourable. On the one hand, a number of them called Louis XV a "criminal" who would suffer God's wrath. They compared him to the Egyptian Pharaoh or even to the Antichrist. On the other hand, some convulsionnaire women dedicated their personal suffering and torture to the King after the attempted assassination of 1757 by Robert-François Damiens.

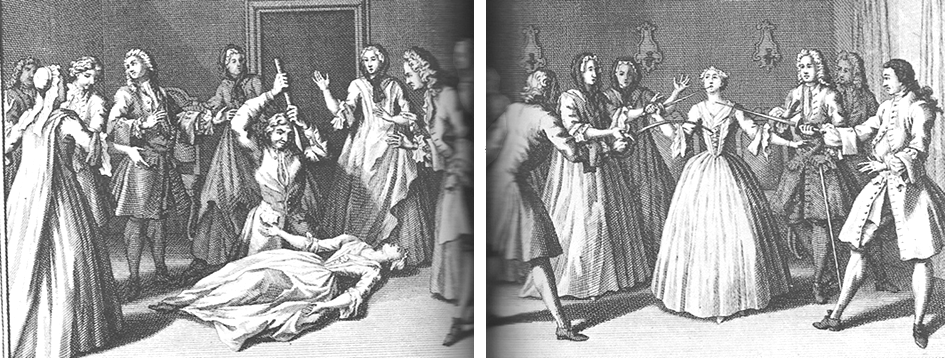
Artistic portrayal of secours at a convulsionnaire meeting. Anonymous engraving from the eighteenth century.

== Responses to Convulsionnaires ==
Altogether, the convulsionnaire phenomenon sparked a great deal of public interest. By mid-century, there had been 1600 publications on the subject. The early convulsions which occurred in 1731 at the cemetery at Saint-Médard attracted large crowds of observers. It is likely that many of these went purely for amusement. Onlookers were even able to rent chairs for 6 sous so that they could sit and watch the strange business that was taking place. The many rumours attracted many curious spectators, some of whom were actually converted to the convulsionnaire movement when they observed the convulsions or even experienced them for themselves.

The cemetery's closure in January 1732 led popular opinion to sympathize with the convulsionnaires and Jansenists. This produced, in turn, a backlash against the Monarchy's religious prerogative. "All powerful though he was," one writer said, "the king had no right to suppress the news of the marvels of God." One protester posted a sign on the cemetery, which read: "By order of the King, it is forbidden to the Divinity to perform any more miracles in this vicinity."

Public opinion, however, would turn against the convulsionnaire movement by the mid-1730s as more scandalous stories of torture and violence came to light. "In the popular mind," Strayer writes, "their tortures had crossed the line between the self-denial of spiritual mystics and sexual brutality. Increasingly, people viewed this strange blend of millenarianism, eroticism, torture, and hysteria as a medical problem rather than a religious phenomenon." In 1735, a group of 30 Paris physicians proposed that "overheated imaginations" were the cause for the convulsions.

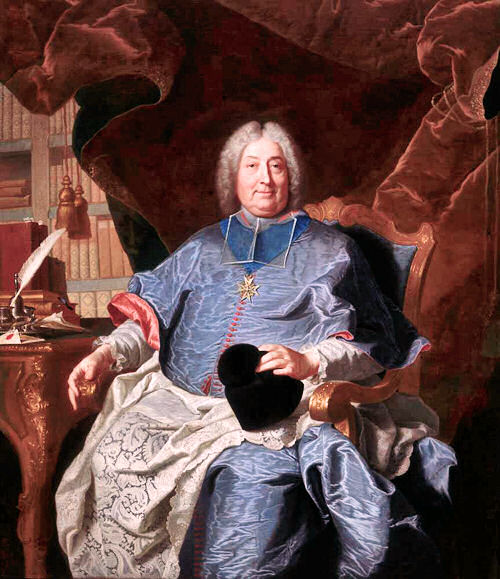
Portrait of Charles Gaspard Guillaume de Vintimille du Luc, Archbishop of Paris

=== Response from the Authorities ===
Cardinal Noailles, the aged Archbishop of Paris, had declared in 1728 that he believed the miracles to be genuine. However, Noailles died in 1729, and his successor, Archbishop Vintimille, was handpicked by Cardinal Fleury, who also served as Chief Minister of France under the young King Louis XV. As noted above, Fleury and Vintimille began a campaign to purge the Parisian clergy of Jansenists. This campaign extended to the convulsionnaires as well. Vintimille halted the process to beatify François de Pâris. Unlike his predecessor, he condemned the miracles as fraudulent in 1731, claiming that they were the result of "Satanic healing" produced by rebellious heretics. Cardinal Fleury compared the convulsionnaires to previous heretical sects, notably the Camisards. When permanent police surveillance failed to dissuade pilgrims from coming to the cemetery, the authorities decided to close it to the public. Hundreds of soldiers came to wall up the entrance on 29 January 1732.

In 1735, Vintimille directed his Inspector General, Nigon de Berty, to conduct an inquiry into the phenomenon. In his report, de Berty established a set of well-defined criteria for miraculous healing. The cure had to exceed the laws of nature. It had to be immediate and perfect. It had to come as a direct result of a religious act, and more than one credible witness was necessary.

The Parlement of Paris contained a small but eloquent Jansenist minority. One of the Parlement Jansenists, Louis-Adrien Le Paige, vigorously defended various aspects of convulsionnaire practice in Parlement as late as 1737. Nonetheless, it appears that the Parlement was generally hostile to the convulsionnaires, launching an inquest against them in 1735. This hostility may have been shared by some of the Jansenists in Parlement who were embarrassed by the convulsions and repudiated any connection to them (see below).

The authorities also sought to involve medical professionals in their bid to discredit the movement. In 1732, René Hérault, the Lieutenant General of Police in Paris, summoned 24 doctors and surgeons to examine seven convulsionnaire prisoners at the Bastille. The doctors determined that the convulsions were voluntary and not divinely inspired. Their conclusions and methodology were widely criticized.

=== Response among Jansenists ===
As mentioned above, the miracle for Jansenists represented God's grace manifested in human history, however briefly. Jansenist theologians and writers were also deeply interested in the power of lay witness and lay faithfulness to true religion. The initiative to create the Jansenist periodical Nouvelles Ecclésiastiques in 1727 owed largely to this interest in inviting ordinary Christians to witness religious truth for themselves. As a result, the movement was thoroughly pleased by the miracles which occurred at Saint-Médard between 1727 and 1731. They separated the 'pure of heart' from the hard-hearted Church hierarchy. For the Paris Jansenists, the miracles served as proof that God was on their side and opposed Unigenitus.

The Nouvelles Ecclésiastiques, working to generate publicity, eagerly proclaimed the miracles to the public and devoted two whole pages to them in 1728. Jansenist churchwardens exercised their influence over their parishes and vigorously encouraged the cult of François de Pâris. Many of the appelant clergy supported the early cult; some even began to preach and perform masses there.

The spread of the convulsion phenomenon, however, divided the Jansenist camp. The Nouvelles Ecclésiastiques continued more or less to defend the convulsions through the 1730s. But the split became evident. Jansenists published as many as 100 different tracts during the years 1732-34 as a heated debate emerged within the movement. Jacques-Joseph Duguet, one of the editors of the Nouvelles Ecclésiastiques fell out of favour with his colleagues when he condemned the convulsions. This debate did not escape the attention of the Cardinal Fleury, who exploited this division by encouraging, even subsidizing the publications of those Jansenists who attacked the convulsionnaire phenomenon. By 1742, popular opinion had turned so far against the convulsions that even the Nouvelles Ecclésiastiques began to revise their stance and withdraw their support.

=== Response from the Philosophes ===
While the anti-hierarchical spirit of the convulsionnaire movement may have appealed to some of the philosophes, they generally looked down upon the phenomenon as a whole as emblematic of religious fanaticism. Historian Lindsay Wilson has suggested that the convulsionnaires challenged the philosophes' ideal of an enlightened public.

For Voltaire, the convulsionnaire phenomenon epitomized irrational superstition and fraudulent religion. He attacked them repeatedly in his writings, and he never wrote about his brother who participated in the movement. Denis Diderot saw the convulsionnaire phenomenon as not only a "sect of fools," but as the link between female nervous disorders and religious fanaticism. Some philosophes, including d'Alembert and La Condamine, attended secret convulsionnaire meetings as observers. D'Alembert, who observed a particularly bloody secours, argued that the convulsions would lose their appeal if only they were made public. He suggested putting them into the fair, perhaps as a kind of side-show, and charging spectators to watch. He predicted that the exposure and ridicule of the convulsionnaires would discredit the entire Jansenist movement, leaving it to fall into obscurity. La Mettrie frequented the assemblies and even assisted at one. Strayer speculates that La Mettrie's experience may have influenced some of his physiological theories.

David Hume, the father of empiricism, wrote: "There surely never was a greater number of miracles ascribed to one person, than those, which were lately said to have been wrought in France upon the tomb of Abbé Paris, the famous Jansenist, with whose sanctity the people were so long deluded. ... many of the miracles were immediately proved upon the spot, before judges of unquestioned integrity, attested by witnesses of credit and distinction, in a learned age, and on the most eminent theatre that is now in the world."

== Contemporary historiography ==
=== Overview ===
E. Robert Kreiser (1975) describes the convulsionnaire movement using the language of identity formation. He suggests that the "spiritual energy" and religious solidarity achieved within the movement helped the individual members to foster individual identities for themselves within a cohesive group.

Catherine Maire (1985 and 1998) stresses the political significance of the convulsionnaire movement, and its centrality to the Jansenist cause.

David Garrioch (2002) argues that the common Parisian kneeling before the tomb of François de Pâris was seeking an expression of faith "that offered the poor full membership of the spiritual community."

Echoing Dale Van Kley's (1996) thoughts on the broader Jansenist controversy, Brian E. Strayer (2008) suggests that

... the cemetery and parish of St-Médard [were transformed] into a stage - and an urban battleground - where the quarrel between orthodoxy and heresy could be fought to its bloody finale. In a very real sense, the convulsionnaire phenomenon constituted the last great European affair to combine both politics and religion into a mass movement involving both the common people and the elite. Its denouement would mark the end of a world in which religion dominated politics.

=== Politically subversive ===
A number of historians have pointed to the movement as politically subversive and threatening to absolutism in 18th-century France.

Kreiser (1975) suggests that the movement's fundamental beliefs were simply incompatible with the established regime. They challenged the status quo by subverting the religious hierarchy, and were perhaps even more subversive than they realized.

Catherine Maire (1985) argues that the convulsionnaire movement helped establish public opinion in France.

Lindsay Wilson 1993 among others, points to the subversive power of the role of women within the movement. Not only did the female convulsionnaires challenge traditional models of Christian female religious behaviour, they were also sometimes 'priestesses' - invested with a ceremonial religious role usually reserved exclusively for men. The prospect of women claiming to serve as intermediaries between God and the people, Wilson writes, was perhaps the most unsettling aspect of the movement for some conservatives.

Monique Cottret (1998) describes the predominance of working class individuals and women in the convulsionnaire movement as the "proletarisation" of Jansenism. She refers to writers in the Nouvelles Ecclésiastiques who promoted the movement's low-class origins as a sign of its greatness.

Strayer 2008 echoing Kreiser and Van Kley 1996 argues that the convulsionnaires' "democratic, congregational polity constituted a serious indictment of the established, hierarchical order in both Church and state. By asserting that the convulsions were divinely inspired, the convulsionnaires threw down the gauntlet at the feet of the Bourbon Monarchy and its dependent episcopacy, challenging both the King's exclusive power to heal ('the King's touch') and the Church's right to control religious activity." This in turn, sparked a "vigorous political discourse" to respond the challenge to religious hierarchy.

=== Medicine and the female imagination ===
Wilson, in her book Women and Medicine in the French Enlightenment (1993), places the convulsionnaire phenomenon within the debate over so-called maladies des femmes (women's illnesses) in 18th-century France. She argues that women figured prominently in the struggle between the emerging professional medical community and other practitioners of medicine which might be called charlatans. She points to physicians (Philippe Hecquet) and theologians (Nigon de Berty) alike who attributed the convulsions to female hysteria, sexual frustration and menstrual irregularities, as well as woman's inherent moral inferiority.

Jan E. Goldstein (1998) has also commented on Hecquet's 1733 treatise on convulsions, which directly links a woman's "imagination" to her uterus and also to the convulsions. "Imagination," Goldstein argues, was the "smear word" of choice among 18th century French writers who considered it antithetical to "enlightened" rationality.

== See also ==
- Age of Enlightenment
- Catholic Church
- Female hysteria
- La Famille (French religious community)
- L'Église gallicane, or 'the Gallican Church'
- Gallicanism
- History of Roman Catholicism in France
- Huguenots
- Religious ecstasy
- Sect
- St. Medardus
- Trance
