= John Berriman =

English clergyman and poet (1691–1768)

John Berriman (1691–1768) was an English clergyman and poet.

== Life ==
He was the son of John Berriman, a London apothecary, and brother of William Berriman. He was a member of St Edmund Hall, Oxford, where he matriculated 11 May 1714, proceeding B.A. 1718, and M.A. 1720. He was for many years in London, as rector of St Olave, Silver Street, and St Alban, Wood Street.

== Works ==
Berriman published in 1722 a sermon (on Kings xxi. 12–13) entitled The Case of Naboth considered and compared with that of the Royal Martyr. This was followed in 1741 by Θεός ἐφανερώθη ἐν σαρκὶ, or a critical dissertation on 1 Tim. iii. 16. Wherein rules are laid down to distinguish in various readings which is genuine, his Moyer Lectures of 1737–8. In 1751 he edited his brother William Berriman's Christian Doctrines explained in Forty Sermons, and in 1758 he wrote a preface to Charles Wheatly's Fifty Sermons.
