= Leonard Twells =

English cleric and theological writer

Leonard Twells (1684?–1742) was an English cleric and theological writer.

== Life ==
His father John was Master of Newark School. He received his education at Jesus College, Cambridge, where he graduated B.A. in 1704.

In 1722 Twells was presented to the vicarage of St. Mary's, Marlborough, Wiltshire. He took the degree of M.A. at Oxford by diploma, 7 December 1733, and was created D.D. in that university, 7 July 1740. In 1737 he was presented to the united rectories of St Matthew, Friday Street, and St Peter, Cheapside, in London. He was also a prebendary of St Paul's Cathedral, and one of the lecturers at St. Dunstan's-in-the-West.

Twells died at Islington on 19 February 1742, leaving a large family without provision.

== Works ==
His works are:

- A Critical Examination of the late new Text and Version of the New Testament, wherein the editor's corrupt text, false version, and fallacious notes are detected and censur'd, 3 parts, London, 1731–2. Against Daniel Mace. Vol. 1, Vol. 2, Vol. 3.
- A Vindication (and a Supplement to the Vindication) of the Gospel of St. Matthew, against a late tract entitled A Dissertation or inquiry concerning the canonical authority of the Gospel according to St. Matthew, 2 pts. London, 1735.
- A Second Vindication of the Gospel of St. Matthew, London, 1735.
- An Answer to the Enquiry into the meaning of Demoniacks in the New Testament, London, 1737.
- An Answer to the Further Enquiry into the meaning of Demoniacks in the New Testament, in a second letter to the author, London, 1738. This and the previous work were addressed to Arthur Ashley Sykes.
- The Theological Works of Dr. Pocock. To which is prefixed an account of his life and writings, London, 1740. This was a subscription of works of Edward Pocock.
- Twenty-four Sermons preached ... at the lecture founded by the Hon. R. Boyle, and eight Sermons preached ... at the lecture founded by the Lady Moyer, 2 vols. London, 1743; 2nd edit. 1755. Boyle Lectures and Moyer Lectures.

== Notes ==
Attribution

This article incorporates text from a publication now in the public domain: "Twells, Leonard". Dictionary of National Biography. London: Smith, Elder & Co. 1885–1900.
