= Charles Wheatly =

English clergyman (1686–1742)

Charles Wheatly (1686–1742) was an English clergyman, known for writings on the Book of Common Prayer.

== Life ==
He was born on 6 February 1686, the son of John Wheatly, a tradesman of London. His mother, whose maiden name was White, was a descendant of Ralph White, brother of Sir Thomas White. Charles entered Merchant Taylors' School on 9 January 1699, and matriculated at St John's College, Oxford, on 28 March 1705. He was elected a Fellow in 1707, and graduated B.A. on 23 January 1710, and M.A. on 28 March 1713, resigning his fellowship in the same year.

On 24 May 1717 he was chosen lecturer of St Mildred-in-the-Poultry, and in 1725 lecturer of St Swithin, Londonstone. On 23 March 1726 he was instituted vicar of Brent Pelham, and on 1 April 1726 vicar of Furneaux Pelham in Hertfordshire. He died at Furneaux Pelham on 13 May 1742, and was buried in the parish church.

== Works ==
His major work was A Rational Illustration of the Book of Common Prayer of the Church of England, the title used for all editions beginning with the 4th (1722) edition. The title of the 1st (1710) and 2nd (1714) editions was The Church of England man's companion; or a rational illustration of the harmony, excellency, and usefulness of the Book of Common Prayer. The title of the 3rd (1720) edition was A Rational Illustration of the Book of Common Prayer, and Administration of the Sacraments, and other Rites and Ceremonies of the Church, according to the use of the Church of England. The 5th (1728) and 6th (1729) editions were the last published during Wheatly's lifetime. The 7th (1752) edition (only title page consulted) was published posthumously and may have been the last edition corrected by the author himself. It probably included the changes caused by the Calendar (New Style) Act 1750, effective 1752. The 8th (1759) edition did include the calendar changes, as did all later editions. It and all later editions deleted the Dedication to John, Lord Bishop of London. Later editions were 1794, 1802, 1810, 1819, 1839, 1845, 1846, 1848, 1849, 1852, 1853, 1867, 1871, and 1890. None of these later editions had a numbered edition printed on the title page. The earliest of the later editions (1794–1819) deleted the first half of the Preface (originally added in 1720) where Wheatly discussed the changes he made to his second edition — this half was included in all later editions (1845–1890). Wheatly was also the author of:

- ‘Bidding of Prayers before Sermon no mark of Disaffection to the present Government,’ London, 1718; new edit. London, 1845.
- ‘The Nicene and Athanasian Creeds ... explained and confirmed by the Holy Scriptures,’ London, 1738.
- ‘Fifty Sermons on Several Subjects, and Occasions,’ ed. John Berriman, London, 1753.

== Family ==
He was twice married: first, on 16 August 1713, to Maria (died 10 December 1724), daughter of William Findall of the Clarendon Press; secondly, to Mary, daughter of Daniel Fogg, rector of All Hallows Staining. His second wife survived him.
