= François de Pâris =

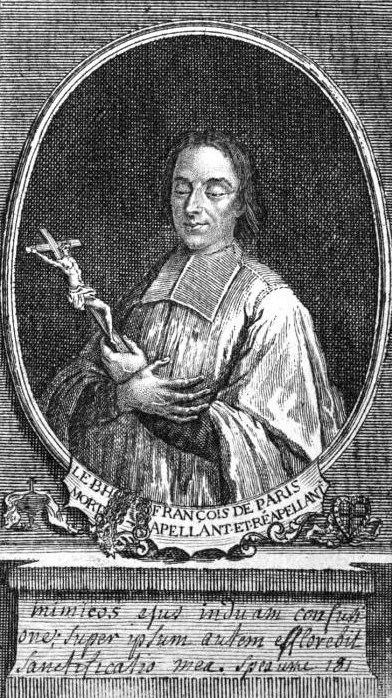
François de Pâris

François de Pâris (French pronunciation: [fʁɑ̃swa d(ə) pɑʁi]; 3 June 1690 – 1 May 1727) was a French Catholic deacon and theologian, a supporter of Jansenism. He became deacon of the Oratory of St. Magloire and was noted for his critique of the papal bull Unigenitus, which condemned Pasquier Quesnel's annotated translation of the Bible. He gave his earnings to the poor, and in his retirement he lived in a state of extreme poverty. After his death, his place of burial gained a reputation for supernatural events and the basis of the Convulsionnaires of Saint-Médard where he is buried. In 1731 there was a movement by the Jansenists to canonize François de Pâris as a saint in acknowledgement of the miracles said to have been performed there and Cardinal Archbishop Louis Antoine de Noailles, who had investigated several of the reports in 1728, had begun the beatification process.

== Life ==
He was born in Paris into a wealthy family, the son of Nicolas de Pâris, Lord of Branscourt, Machault and Pasquy (1658–1714), and a member of the Parlement of Paris. His mother, Charlotte Rolland, was the daughter of the mayor of Reims. According to biographies published after his death, he was tutored as a young boy by Augustinians at Nanterre. Originally destined for a career in law, he went against his father's wishes and chose a career in the Church instead. In 1712 a bout of smallpox left his face horribly scarred, "an affliction for which he thanked God". In 1713, at the age of 23, three months after the death of his mother in April, he entered the seminary of the Oratory of St. Magloire, where he studied the scriptures. In December 1713, his father Nicolas de Pâris made a will deposited with a notary before he died in March 1714. François opposed the bull Unigenitus, which condemned Pasquier Quesnel's annotated translation of the Bible. He then gave further support to the Jansenists. After three years at the Oratory, Pâris was ordained a deacon. During his time there he gave to the poor his annual family pension, and there is evidence to suggest that he turned down a position as canon of Reims Cathedral in 1718 or 1719 because of his humble stance. During his later career he was associated with the College of Bayeux in Paris, a haven for Jansenist priests and follows, disturbed by the Church hierarchy or the authorities.

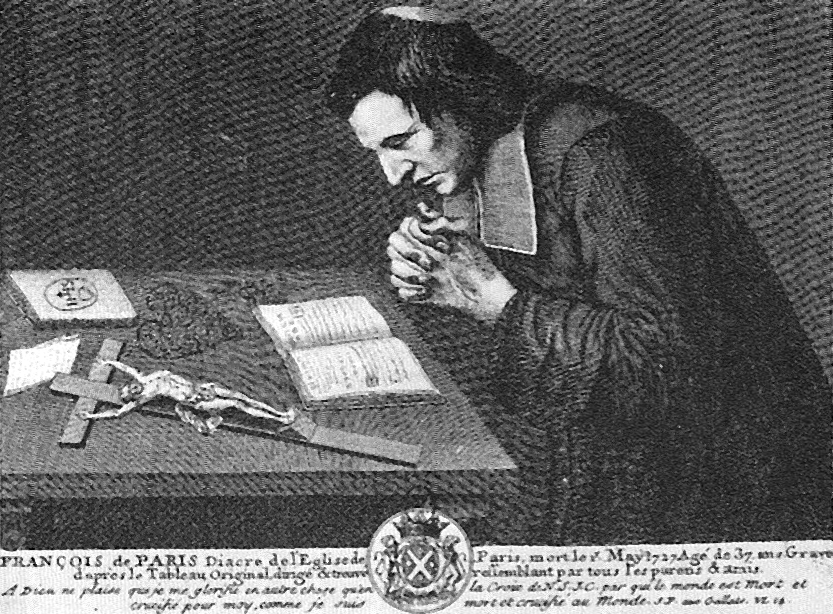
François de Pâris, Diacre Paris

François de Pâris retired to a modest house Faubourg Saint-Marceau, Paris, where he led a very austere life. Indeed, his living condition was so lowly that he "lodged in a hutch of planks set up in a courtyard, wore a hair shirt, and ate one meal a day, all while knitting stockings for the poor and giving advice to those who asked for it. He modeled himself after St. Francis and was apparently considered a local saint by many. His life has been described as one of "heroic humility".

During the final years of his life, Pâris became increasingly reclusive, and his ascetic lifestyle became increasingly severe, and he practised self-flagellation:

His bare feet became cut and bruised from walking on the paving stones ... He slept on an old armoire, covered himself with a sheet bristling with iron wires that tore his flesh ... He wore a hair shirt, a spiked metal belt, and a chain around his right arm. He beat himself with an iron-tipped lash until the blood ran down his back. He lit no fire for warmth even during the coldest winter days.

== Death and aftermath ==
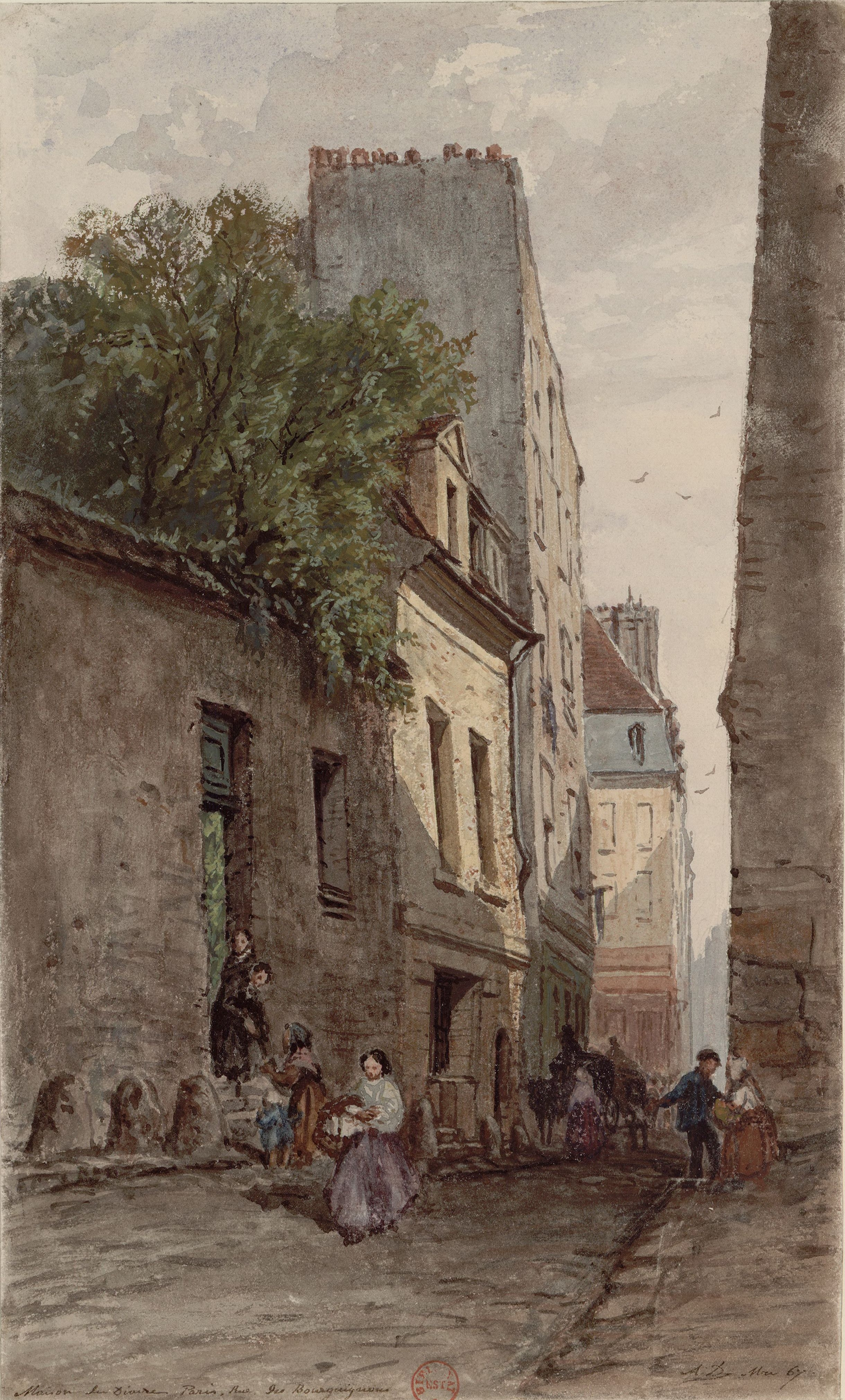
House of François de Pâris, by Adrien Dauzats (1867)

Only 36 years old, Pâris died on 1 May 1727. Large numbers of people from across the social spectrum, including the Cardinal Archbishop Noailles, came to attend his funeral in the small chapel at Saint-Médard. During the funeral and after, people began to collect snippets of hair and fingernails, splinters of wood from his casket or furniture, soil from his gravesite, and other souvenirs which might serve as holy relics. He was buried at the graveyard there on the Rue Mouffetard in the 5th arrondissement of Paris, not far from the Jardin des Plantes. Shortly after the funeral, his tomb became the site of religious pilgrimages and purported wonder-working. Miracles were said to be performed before his tomb which left people in a state of ecstasy. The Jansenists came to pray at the cemetery. His admirers composed hymns and self-styled hagiographies praising the late deacon as a saint. In June 1728, Cardinal Noailles started an official enquiry to investigate five of the reported miracles and in the end his findings led to him posthumously bestowing upon François the title of "bienheureux". Many of the city's prominent Jansenists wanted Pâris to be made into a saint, and Cardinal Noailles even began the process of beatification.

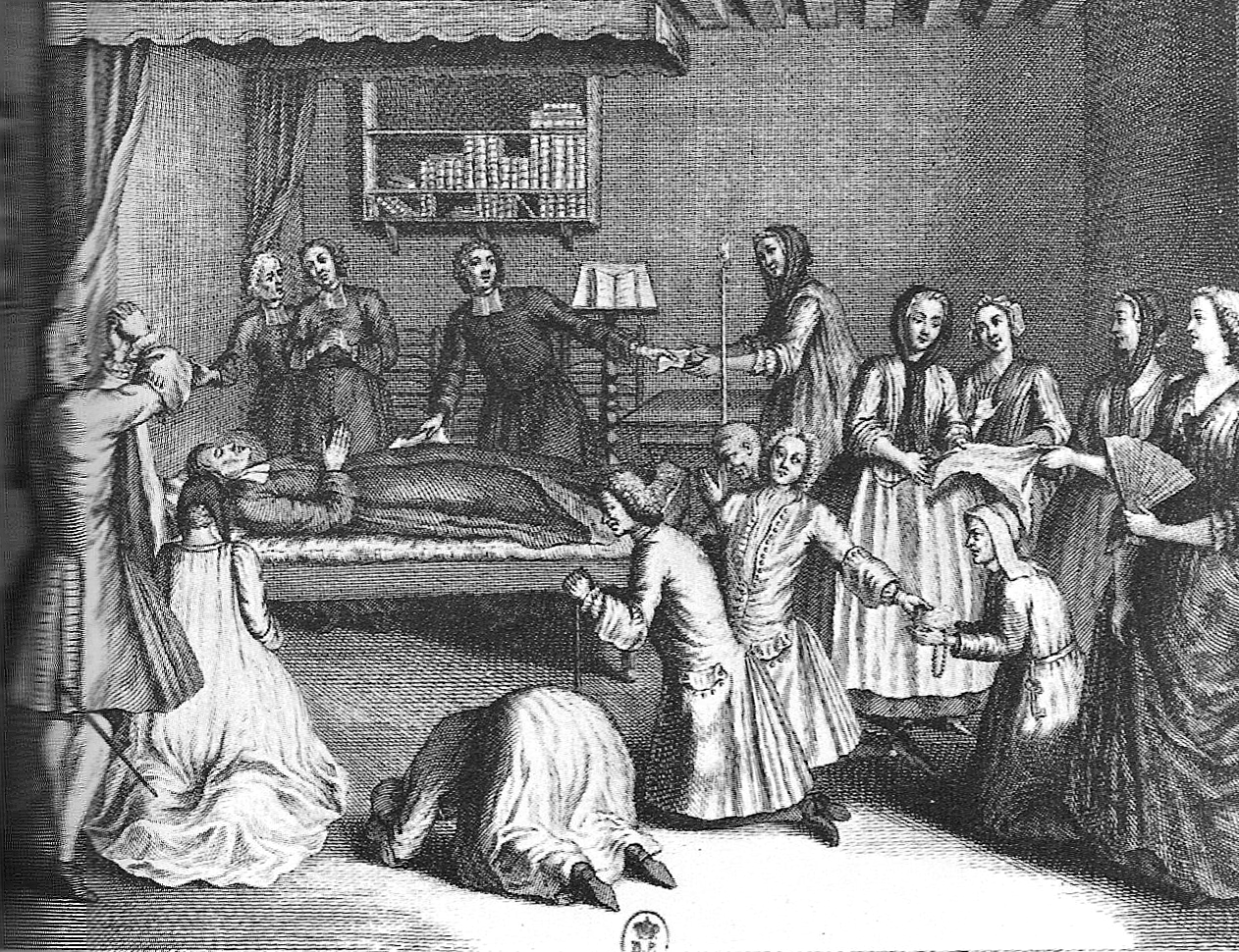
Engraving of François de Pâris's death

In 1731, a phenomenal series of events began being reported at the graveyard which reportedly brought about extraordinary cures, apparently after people visiting experienced "violent convulsive movements which overtook the patients soon after their bodies touched the marble of the tomb, sometimes even without approaching it, by swallowing, in wine or water, a small portion of the earth gathered from around it." These people became known as the "Convulsionnaires of Saint-Médard". At least 800 were reportedly cured by the convulsions of 1731, amongst them were several prominent people such as Louis Basile Carré de Montgeron, a well-respected magistrate and Counsellor of the Parliament of Paris who converted to Jansenism on the 7 September 1731 after experiencing a miracle at the tomb of François de Pâris. He began compiling a 3 volume book of some 1800 pages afterwards in a work which is described as "one of the most extraordinary works that ever issued from the press." Lives was also published in 1731, by Pierre Boyer, Jean-Louis Barbeau de La Bruyère, and Barthélémy Doyen.

However, several writers believed that the extraordinary events at the graveyard were grossly exaggerated. Dom La Taste, Bishop of Bethlehem, authored Lettres Theologiques and Memoire Theologique, both critiques of the Convulsionists and Abbe d'Asfeld published Vains Efforts des Discernans, a similar work denouncing the extravagance of the people who claimed to have experienced the supernatural there. Due to the rising hysteria which amounted in 1731, with increasingly bizarre and extraordinary events frequently reported which ultimately led to conversions to Jansenism in the thousands, Louis XV was forced to close the churchyard on 27 January 1732. However, the earth which had been taken from the grave was valued by Jansenists and they continued their practices. Demoiselle Fourcroy, for instance, alleged she had been cured of her medically diagnosed condition of anchylosis on 14 April 1732 and said of it, "They caused me to take wine in which was some earth from the tomb of M. de Paris, and I immediately engaged in prayer, as the commencement of a neuvaine (nine-days of devotion). Almost at the same moment I was seized with a great shuddering, and soon after with a violent agitation of the members, which caused my whole body to jerk into the air, and gave me a force I had never before possessed, so that the united strength of several persons present could scarcely restrain me. After a time, in the course of these violent convulsive movements, I lost all consciousness. As soon as they passed off, I recovered my senses, and felt a sensation of tranquillity and internal peace, such as I had never experienced before."

== See also ==
- Convulsionnaires of Saint-Médard#François de Pâris

== Bibliography ==
- Garrioch, David. 2002. The Making of Revolutionary Paris. Berkeley: University of California Press.
- Strayer, Brian E. 2008. Suffering Saints: Jansenists and Convulsionnaires in France, 1640–1799. Brighton, UK: Sussex Academic Press.
