= Richard Mounteney =

Irish judge and classical scholar

The Honourable Richard Mounteney
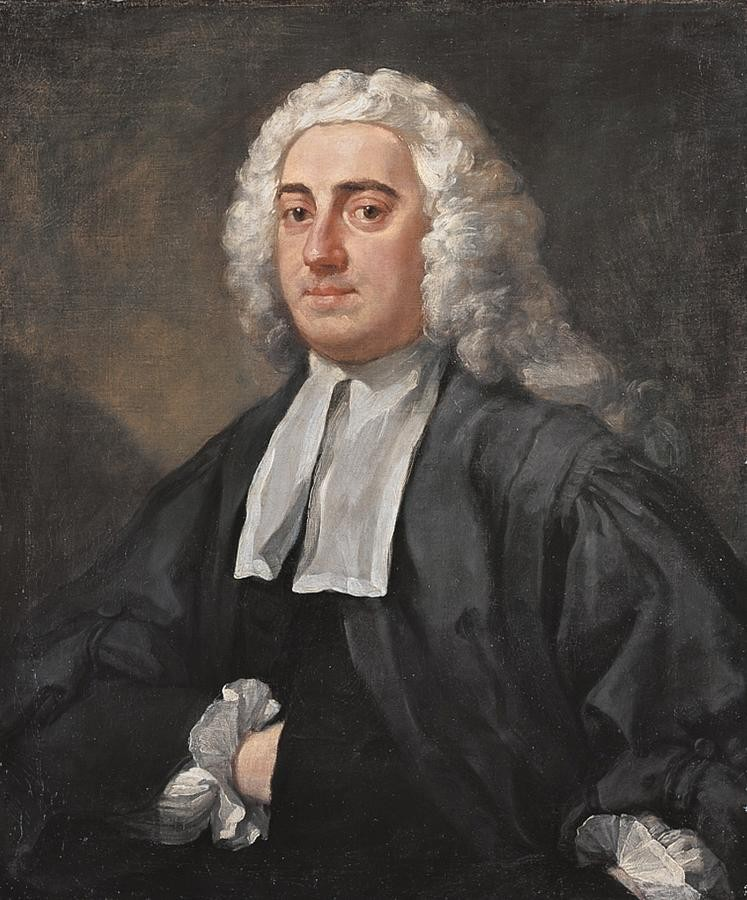
- Richard Mounteney, 1746 portrait by William Hogarth.

Baron of the Court of Exchequer (Ireland)
- In office 1737–1768

Personal details
- Born: 1707 Putney, Surrey
- Died: 3 March 1768 Belturbet, County Cavan
- Education: King's College, Cambridge
- Profession: Barrister, Judge

Richard Mounteney (or Mountney) (1707–1768) was an Irish judge and classical scholar.

== Life ==
The son of Richard Mounteney, an officer in the customs house, by Maria, daughter of John Carey, he was born at Putney, Surrey, in 1707, and educated at Eton School. He was elected in 1725 to King's College, Cambridge, was noted as a good classical scholar, and became a Fellow. He graduated B.A. in 1729, and M.A. in 1735. Among his close friends at university were Sneyd Davies and Sir Edward Walpole.

Mounteney was called to the bar at the Inner Temple, and by the influence of his patron Sir Robert Walpole, he was appointed in 1737 one of the Barons of the Court of Exchequer (Ireland). He was one of the judges who presided at the trial between James Annesley and Richard Annesley, 6th Earl of Anglesey, in 1743.

Mounteney died on 3 March 1768 at Belturbet, County Cavan, while on circuit.

== Works ==
His works are:

- Demosthenis selectæ Orationes (Philippica I) et tres Olynthiacæ orationes. Ad codices MSS. recensuit, textum, scholiasten, et versionem plurimis in locis castigavit, notis insuper illustravit Ricardus Mounteney, Cambridge (University Press), 1731; 2nd edit. London, 1748; 3rd edit. Eton, 1755; other editions, London and Eton, 1764 and 1771, London, 1778, 1785, 1791, 1806, 1811, 1826, 1827. With reference to the second edition there appeared Baron Mountenay's celebrated Dedication of the select Orations of Demosthenes to the late Sir Robert Walpole, Bart. of Ministerial Memory, done into plain English, and illustrated with Notes and Comments, and dedicated to Trinity College, Dublin. By Æschines the third, Dublin printed, London reprinted 1748.
- Observations on the probable Issue of the Congress (i.e. the Congress of Aix-la-Chapelle), London, 1748.

== Family ==
Mounteney's first wife Margaret was buried at Donnybrook, Dublin, on 8 April 1756. His second marriage was with Marie Angelique Madeleine de la Cherois, Dowager Countess of Mount Alexander, the widow of Thomas Montgomery, 5th Earl of Mount Alexander. She was the daughter of Daniel de la Cherois of Lisbon, Portugal and his wife Anne Crommelin, daughter of Louis Crommelin. The marriage was announced in Sleator's Public Gazetteer on 6 October 1759.Marie died in 1771.
