= John Rogers (priest, born 1679) =

English clergyman

John Rogers (1679–1729) was an English clergyman.

== Life ==
The son of John Rogers, vicar of Eynsham, Oxford, he was born there. He was educated at New College School, and was elected scholar of Corpus Christi College, Oxford, where he matriculated on 7 February 1693, graduating B.A. in 1697, and M.A. in 1700.

Rogers took orders, but did not obtain his fellowship by succession until 1706. In 1710 he proceeded B.D. About 1704 he was presented to the vicarage of Buckland in Berkshire (now Oxfordshire), where he was popular as a preacher. In 1712 he became lecturer of St Clement Danes in The Strand, London, and later of Christ Church, Newgate Street, with St Leonard's, Foster Lane. In 1716 he received the rectory of Wrington, Somerset, and resigned his fellowship in order to marry. In 1719 he was appointed a canon, and in 1721 sub-dean of Wells Cathedral. He seems to have retained all these appointments until 1726, when he resigned the lectureship of St Clement Danes.

For his controversial writings the degree of D.D. was conferred on him by diploma at Oxford. In 1726 he became chaplain in ordinary to the future King George II, then Prince of Wales, and about the same time left London with the intention of spending the remainder of his life at Wrington. In 1728 Rogers accepted from the dean and chapter of St Paul's Cathedral the vicarage of St Giles, Cripplegate, but held the living little more than six months.

Rogers died on 1 May 1729, and was buried on the 13th at Eynsham. His funeral sermon was preached by Nathaniel Marshall, and was the occasion of Some Remarks, by "Philalethes" (Arthur Ashley Sykes).

== Works ==
Rogers gained a reputation in the Bangorian controversy, while he joined with Francis Hare in the attack on Benjamin Hoadly. In 1719 he wrote A Discourse of the Visible and Invisible Church of Christ to prove that the powers claimed by the priesthood were not inconsistent with the supremacy of Christ or with the liberty of Christians. An answer was published by Arthur Ashley Sykes, and to this Rogers replied.

In 1727 he published a volume of eight sermons, The Necessity of Divine Revelation and the Truth of the Christian Religion, to which was prefixed a preface containing a criticism of the Literal Scheme of Prophecy considered, by Anthony Collins, the deist. This preface did not satisfy his friends, and drew a critical letter from Dr. A. Marshall . Samuel Chandler, bishop of Lichfield, included remarks on the preface in his Conduct of the Modern Deists, and Collins wrote A Letter to Dr. Rogers, on occasion of his Eight Sermons. To all of these works Rogers replied in 1728 in his Vindication of the Civil Establishment of Religion. This work prompted Some Short Reflections, by Thomas Chubb, 1728, and a preface in Chandler's History of Persecution, 1736.

Many of his sermons were collected and published in three volumes after his death by John Burton. Rogers well acquainted with the writings of Richard Hooker and John Norris. After his death there were published his A Persuasive to Conformity addressed to the Dissenters (London, 1736) and A Persuasive to Conformity addressed to the Quakers, London, 1747.
