= Thomas Bennet (clergyman) =

English clergyman

Thomas Bennet (1673–1728) was an English clergyman, known for controversial and polemical writings, and as a Hebraist.

== Life ==
Bennet was born at Salisbury, Wiltshire, on 7 May 1673, and was educated at a free school there, the City Grammar School. He entered St John's College, Cambridge, in 1688, before he was fifteen, going on to take the degrees of B.A. and M.A. by 1694, and was elected a Fellow of his college.

In 1700, by chance, Bennet went to Colchester on the death of a clergyman friend there, John Rayne, and was called on to preach the funeral sermon. He was appointed to succeed Rayne and was instituted on 15 January 1701.

He left Colchester at the end of the decade, and became deputy chaplain to Chelsea Hospital. He preached a funeral sermon at St Olave's Church, Southwark, and was chosen lecturer there. He was appointed morning preacher at St Lawrence Jewry under John Mapletoft, and was also presented by the dean and chapter of St Paul's Cathedral to St Giles Cripplegate. The presentation, however, involved him in disputes over a tithe on peas and beans.

In 1711, he was awarded the degree of Doctor of Divinity. In 1717 he married Elizabeth Hunt of Salisbury, and by her had three daughters. He died on 9 October 1728. Thomas Emlyn praised him for his "small respect to decrees of councils or mere church authority".

== Works ==
In 1695, Hebrew verses by Bennet on the death of Queen Mary were printed in the university collection. His first major publication was An Answer to the Dissenters Plea for Separation, or an Abridgment of the London Cases (1699, 5th edition 1711).

In 1701 appeared A Confutation of Popery in three parts. In 1702 he followed up his Answer by A Discourse of Schism. Timothy Shepherd of Braintree answered this work, and Bennet replied in 1703. Bennet found another antagonist in a fellow clergyman in A Justification of the Dissenters against Mr. Bennet's charge of damnable Schism, &c. … By a Divine of the Church of England by Law established, 1705.

Bennet's next book was Devotions, viz. Confessions, Petitions, Intercessions, and Thanksgivings, for every day in the week, and also before, at, and after the Sacrament, with Occasional Prayers for all Persons whatsoever. In 1705 Bennet also published A Confutation of Quakerism. B. Lindley answered this in 1710.

In 1708, perhaps stung by passing gibes at his own printed prayers, Bennet published A brief History of joint Use of precomposed set Forms of Prayer, and A Discourse of Joint Prayer, and later in the same year A Paraphrase with Annotations upon the Book of Common Prayer, wherein the text is explained, objections are answered, and advice is humbly offered, both to the clergy and the laity, for promoting true devotion to the use of it. In 1710 these works were tacitly vindicated by Bennet in A Letter to Mr. B. Robinson, occasioned by his Review of the Case of Liturgies and their Imposition, and in a Second Letter to Mr. Robinson on the same subject (also 1710). In 1711 he published The Rights of the Clergy of the Christian Church.

In 1714, Bennet published Directions for Studying. In 1715 appeared his Essay on the XXXIX Articles. In 1716, he assailed the extruded churchmen of the nonjuring schism in The Nonjurors Separation from the Public Assemblies of the Church of England examined and proved to be schismatical upon their own Principles. In 1718, he published A Discourse of the ever-blessed Trinity in Unity, with an Examination of Dr Clarke's Scriptural Doctrine of the Trinity. Like all his books, these were answered. His idea of the Trinity was Sabellian. In 1726, he gave to the world a small Hebrew Grammar.
