= Thomas Church (priest) =

Thomas Church (20 October 1707 – 1756) was a British priest and controversialist.

== Life ==
Born at Marlborough, Wiltshire on 20 October 1707, he graduated at Brasenose College, Oxford, Bachelor of Arts (BA) 1726, Oxford Master of Arts (MA Oxon) 1731. He was vicar of Battersea from 1740 till his death, 23 December 1756. He also held a prebendal stall at St Paul's Cathedral (3 January 1743/4), and was lecturer at St Anne's, Soho.

== Works ==
His vindication, against Conyers Middleton, of the miraculous powers of the Early Christian church, earned him the degree of Doctor of Divinity (DD) from the University of Oxford (1749). He criticised the philosophy of deism, and the Methodists. Besides sermons, he published:

- An Essay towards vindicating the literal sense of the Demoniacks in the New Testament, 1737 (anonymous). This controversial work was addressed to Arthur Ashley Sykes, and had a sequel.
- A short State of the Controversy about the meaning of the Demoniacks in the New Testament, 1739 (anonymous). A further work in the Sykes controversy.
- A Serious and Expostulatory Letter to the Rev. Mr. George Whitefield, on the occasion of his late Letter to the Bishop of London and other Bishops, 1744. He reproached George Whitefield for his frequent absences from his cure of souls in the Colony of Georgia.
- Remarks on the Rev. Mr. John Wesley's Last Journal, 1745. Against the doctrines of John Wesley.
- A Vindication of the Miraculous Powers which subsisted in the three first Centuries of the Christian Church, in answer to Dr. Middleton's Free Enquiry, 1750.
- An Analysis of the Philosophical Works of the late Lord Viscount Bolingbroke, London, 1755; Dublin, 1756 (these editions, separately printed, were published anonymously). Henry St John, 1st Viscount Bolingbroke is said to have been his patron); the analysis is terse and closely argued.
