= William Berriman =

English theologian (1688–1750)

William Berriman D.D. (1688–1750) was an English theologian, known as a Boyle Lecturer and controversialist.

== Life ==
The son of John Berriman, apothecary in Bishopsgate Street, London, in the parish of St. Ethelburga, by Mary, daughter of William Wagstaffe, of Farnborough, Warwickshire, and grandson of the Rev. Charles Berriman, rector of Beddington, Surrey, was born on 24 September 1688. His first school was at Banbury, Oxfordshire; he continued there seven years. He moved on to Merchant Taylors' School, London, under Matthew Shorting, in 1700. He entered as a commoner of Oriel College, Oxford, on 4 March 1705. He came into residence in Oxford on 21 June 1705, where he graduated B.A. 2 November 1708, M.A. 2 June 1711; and D.D. 25 June 1722. He studied Hebrew, Syriac, and Arabic.

Berriman was ordained deacon at Oxford by Bishop William Talbot, but continued in residence at the university till he was settled in London on 5 May 1712. He was curate at Allhallows, Thames Street in 1712. He was ordained priest on 12 December 1712 by Philip Bisse, Bishop of Hereford. He was chosen lecturer of St. Michael's, Queenhithe, 22 July 1714. He became domestic chaplain to John Robinson, bishop of London, April 1720, and resided at Fulham. On 26 April 1722 he was presented to St. Andrew's Undershaft, resigning his lectureship.

On 16 June 1727 he was elected fellow of Eton College, and Eton became his summer residence. He died on 5 February 1750, in his sixty-second year.

== Works ==
Berriman was known privately to have been the author of A seasonable Review of Mr. Whiston's Account of Primitive Doxologies, 1719, and of A Second Review, also 1719. In 1723–4 was delivered his Historical Account of the Trinitarian Controversy, the Lady Moyer's lecture, published 1725. In 1731 followed A Defence of some Passages in the Historical Account.

In 1730–1 he preached the Boyle lecture, published in 1733 (2 vols.) In 1733 appeared his Brief Remarks on Mr. Chandler's Introduction to the History of the Inquisition, against Samuel Chandler. There were other occasional sermons and tractates. His brother John Berriman published posthumously two volumes of sermons, as Christian Doctrines and Duties explained and recommended in xl Sermons (1751).

== Family ==
On 17 November 1724 he married Mary Hudson.
