= Shipwreck of Dellys =

Shipwreck of Dellys (1830)
- Part of the French conquest of Algeria
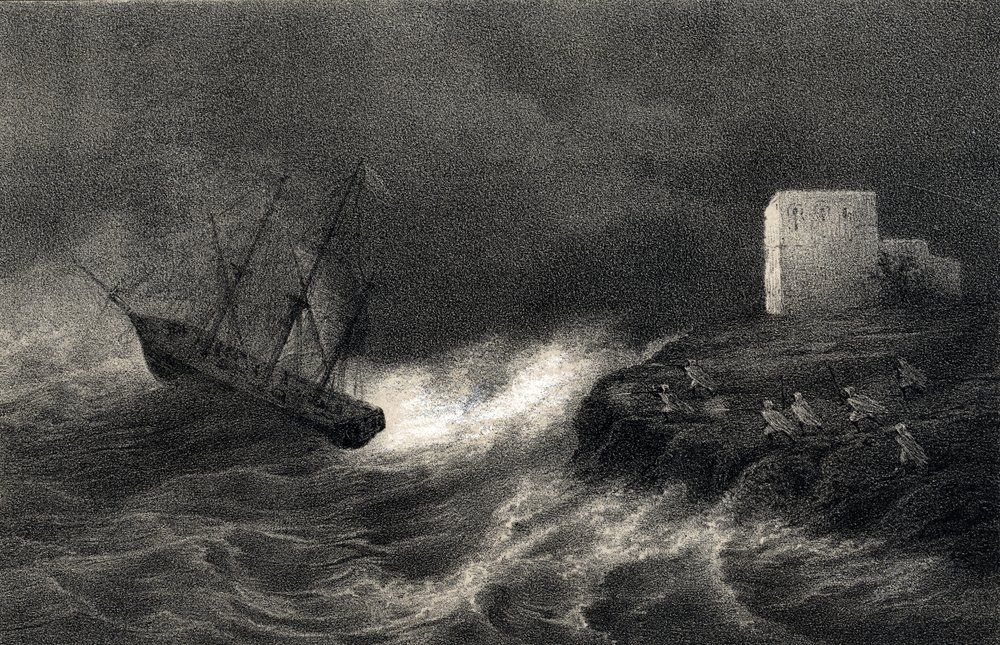
- Shipwreck of the bricks Aventure and Silene on the Algerian coast May 15, 1830 by an unknown artist
Date	15 May 1830
Location	Dellys, Algeria 36.915789°N 3.9146904°E
Result	Algerian victory

Belligerents
Deylik of Algiers	Kingdom of France

Commanders and leaders
Hussein Dey; Ibrahim Agha	Louis de Bourmont; Armand Bruat; Félix-Ariel d'Assigny

Casualties and losses
Presumably none	1 drowned sailor 100 prisoners: 20 killed; 80 captured

The Shipwreck of Dellys took place in May 1830, during the French conquest of Algeria. It involved French troupes coloniales, under captains Félix-Ariel d'Assigny (1794–1846) and Armand Joseph Bruat (1796–1855), who were captured by armed Bedouins of the town of Dellys.

== Historical context ==
On 29 April 1827, Pierre Deval, Consul General of the Kingdom of France, was hit with a fly whisk by Hussein Dey in the Casbah of Algiers, in what became known as the fly-whisk incident. Following this incident, King Charles X of France ordered the preparation of a punitive expedition against the Regency of Algiers at the beginning of 1830.

France then imposed a blockade and evacuated its diplomatic staff from the city of Algiers in retaliation, and the French government of Jules de Polignac decided on 31 January 1830 to organize a naval military landing in Algiers under the high command of Admiral Emmanuel Halgan. General Victor de Bourmont was appointed on 11 April 1830 by King Charles X as head of the French Navy expeditionary force in the direction of Algiers.

Lieutenant Armand Joseph Bruat asked Admiral Halgan to join this expedition, the preparations for which were being vigorously pushed. After Bruat wrote a letter dated 3 March 1830 to Admiral Halgan insisting on his desire to participate in the command of this expedition, his wish was granted, and he disembarked from the ship Le Breslau on 8 March. He received the command of the brig Le Sylène on 18 March.

== Sea storm ==
On the night of 15 May 1830, Lieutenant Bruat, on Le Sylène, returned from the Mahón in the island of Menorca, bringing dispatches for the commander of the blockade forces of Victor de Bourmont concerning the fleet preparing for the landing of Algiers. He met the brig L'Aventure near Cape Bengut in Dellys, not far from the mouth of Oued Sebaou and the mountain range of Khachna, about 36 nautical miles east of Cape Caxine.

The brig L'Aventure was that night surveilling the coast of the plain of the Kabyle tribes of Issers and Amraoua, and was commanded by Lieutenant Félix-Ariel d'Assigny, who was older in rank than Lieutenant Bruat. Le Sylène, commanded by Bruat, began to sail in tandem with L'Aventure, commanded by d'Assigny. A violent northwesterly wind was blowing, which dispersed the two ships, and they could not regroup.

== Shipwreck ==
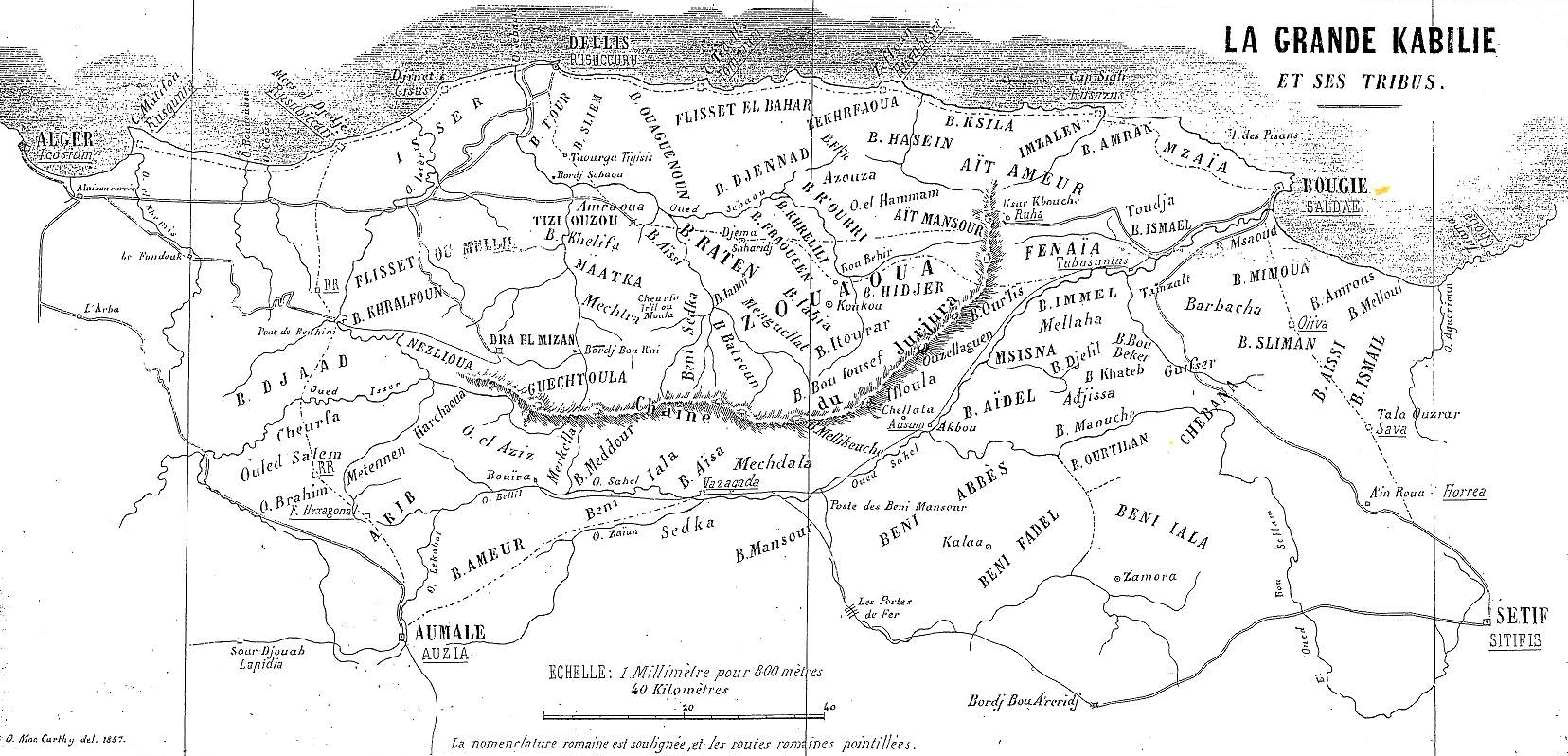
Kabylia

Misled by a thick mist and opaque fog, the brig L'Aventure was wrecked on the Dellys coast, dragging behind it Le Sylène. The assembled crews of the two brigs were unable to refloat the vessels, so they were stranded on the enemy shore. Only one man died in the wreck, who drowned in the rough sea.

As soon as the docking was finished, the sick and injured sailors were grounded first, then the rest of the crew, before the two captains decided on what more to do.

Bruat and d'Assigny brought together the officers of the two brigs, to whom they presented their only options. The first alternative was to arm the sailors with the means available and to be on the lookout near the brigs until the weather became lenient and could allow the warships of the French fleet to come and save them. The second option was to show no resistance to the Algerians living in the vicinity and to let the natives of lower Kabylia take them hostages and lead them and transport them to Algiers, where the consular and diplomatic intervention could save them from execution.

The cannons and rifles on board were unusable because the powders were wet, and the two shipwrecked crews could not thus resort to the use of weapons against possible Algerian attackers. The castaways opted for the second, peaceful alternative, because their powder was also wet and the mist and darkness did not allow the two lost crews to hope to be seen and rescued by the French Navy.

== March to Algiers and capture of crews ==
Gathering the two crews, the two officers d'Assigny and Bruat gathered some food and decided to head west with their soldiers to the city of Algiers within the Mitidja plain by following the paths of lower Kabylia, starting at 4:00 on the morning of 16 May 1837.

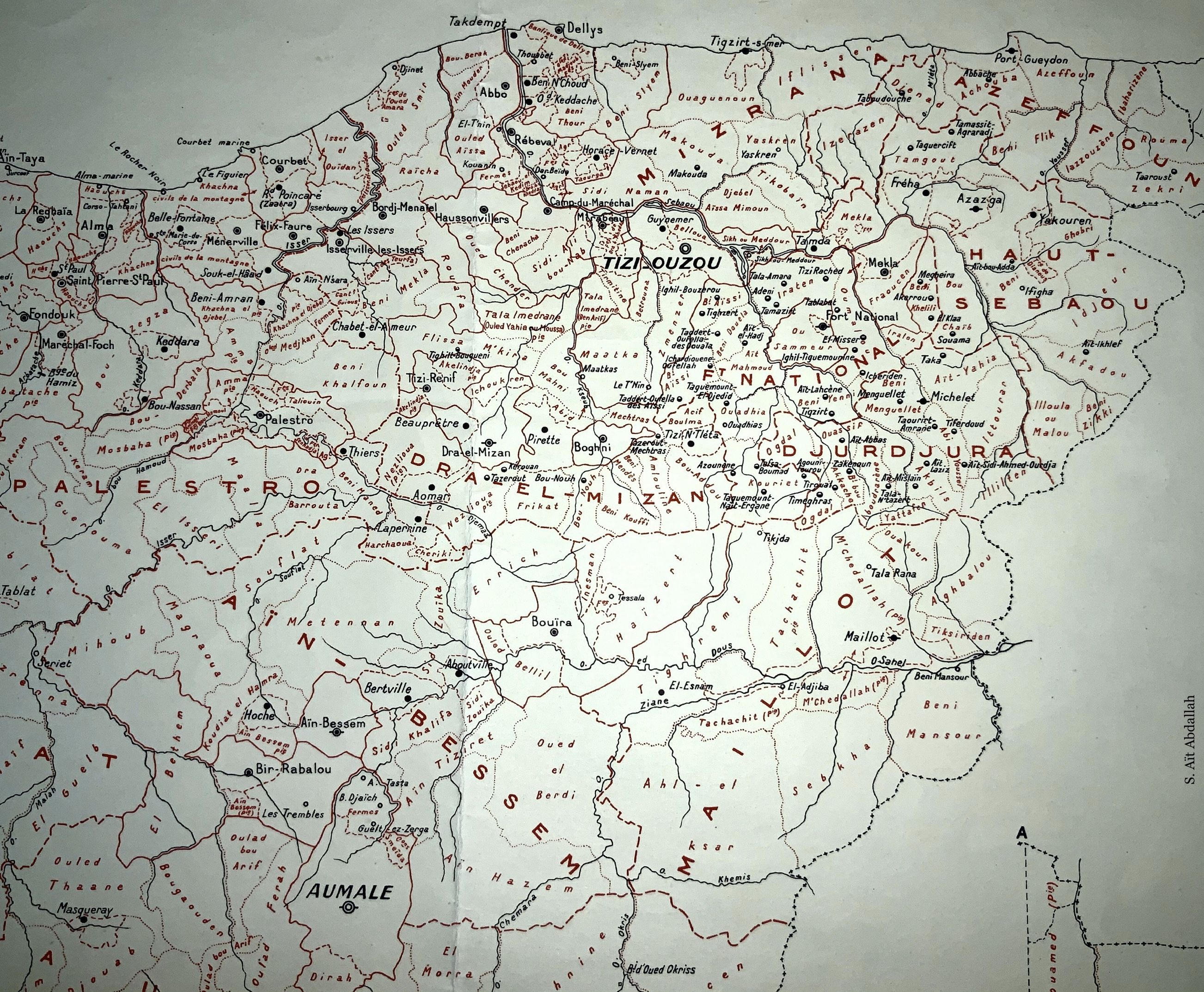
Igawawen tribes

The two crews had walked a kilometer along the road to Algiers on 16 May, passing the Issers plain and the Col des Beni Aïcha, when they were attacked by a large group of armed Bedouins. A Maltese sailor from the brig Le Sylène tried to negotiate with the Algerians because he spoke Arabic fluently. He tried to pass off his companions as English passengers and temporarily managed to save them from certain death.

Recovering from their mistake on the identity of the unknown marchers, the Bedouins returned to capture these foreigners and have them imprisoned.

Lieutenant Bruat then asked his torturers to be brought before one of their closest Algerian leaders. He was taken alone and almost naked and was dragged in front of the governor of Dellys. The latter sought to snatch him by the threat and violence of the revelations on the intentions and forces of the French fleet which set sail off the coast of Algiers.

This long march through a foreign country was followed by the conduction of hostages during the fifth day of captivity, 20 May 1830, at the Bouberack river (Oued Amara) and handed over to the officers of Dey Hussein.

== Massacre of the hostages ==
After having injured a woman amid an imprudent escape attempt, the French became subjects of Bedouin fury. Many prisoners were executed and beheaded, and some of the severed heads were taken to Algiers to be displayed to the population.

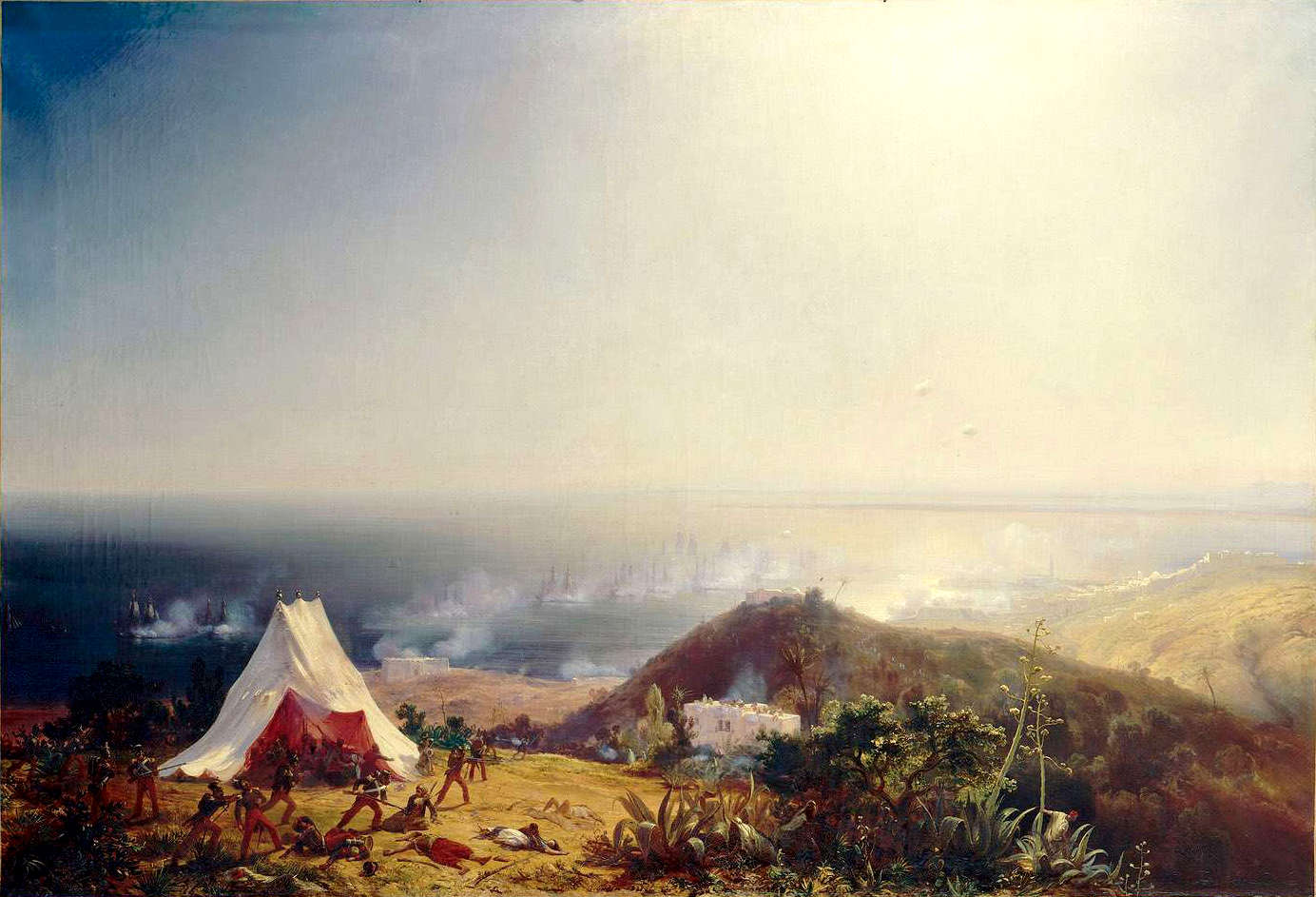
Invasion of Algiers in 1830

== Imprisonment in Algiers ==
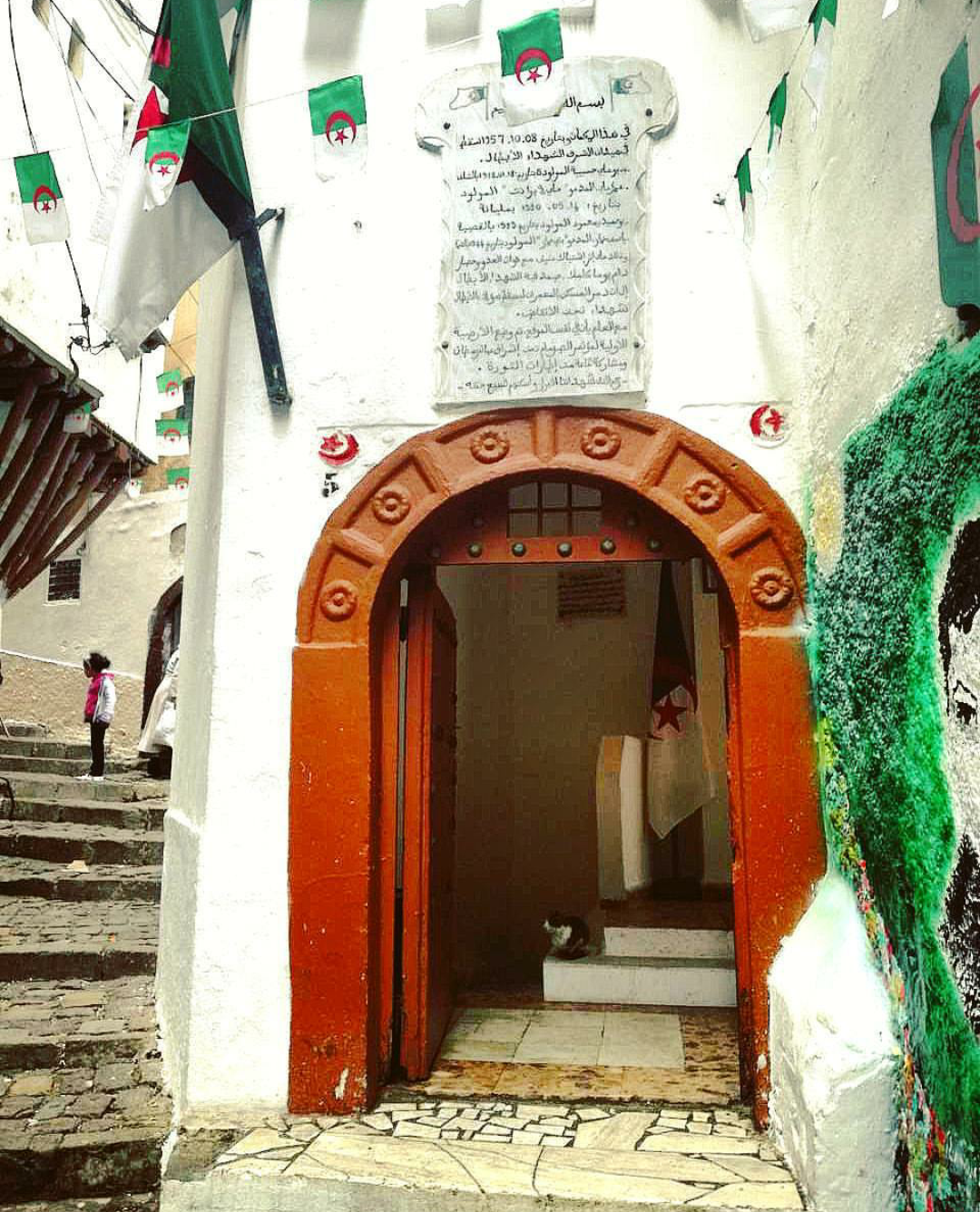
Casbah of Algiers

The governor of Dellys then transferred the sailors and soldiers who had been spared and remained alive with their commanders Bruat and d'Assigny to Algiers so that Ibrahim Agha could decide their fate. The convoy of hostages marched through the Col des Beni Aïcha and the Meraldene valley, and they spent the night of 20 May at Cap Matifou near Bordj Tamentfoust.

The next day, 21 May, the hostage crews entered Algiers, escorted by Algerian soldiers and followed by a large group of civilians, and they were led past the Dey Palace to the Casbah of Algiers. There they saw the heads of their comrades of the first massacred group, before being taken to the prison. When the hostages were transferred to the jails of Algiers, Agha Ibrahim renewed threats of torture and death if Bruat and d'Assigny did not decide to speak up and reveal the French plans relating to the invasion of Algiers in 1830.

It was then that the intervention of the Consuls of Sardinia and England saved these prisoners from being tortured. Lieutenant Bruat was also able to communicate to Admiral Guy-Victor Duperré a detailed and secret report of the observations of a military nature that he had made note of from the shipwreck of Dellys to the jails of Algiers. The intervention of the two European Consuls included immediately requesting an audience of the Dey to obtain to receive and shelter the officers Bruat and d'Assigny at home in their consular residences, but the two officers of the navy declined the proposal and chose to remain with their subordinates.

The Dey Hussein sent the captured sailors the objects that their first needs of personal hygiene and usual use demanded as soon as they arrived in the prison. When the French fleet appeared in the bay of Algiers, the attention and the Dey's generosity was suddenly reduced and moderate towards them. The captivity of these survivors became harsher when the Dey learned of the landing at Sidi Fredj, but when the fall of the Casbah of Algiers became imminent, the Dey returned to softer and more lenient feelings with them.

== Release of detainees ==
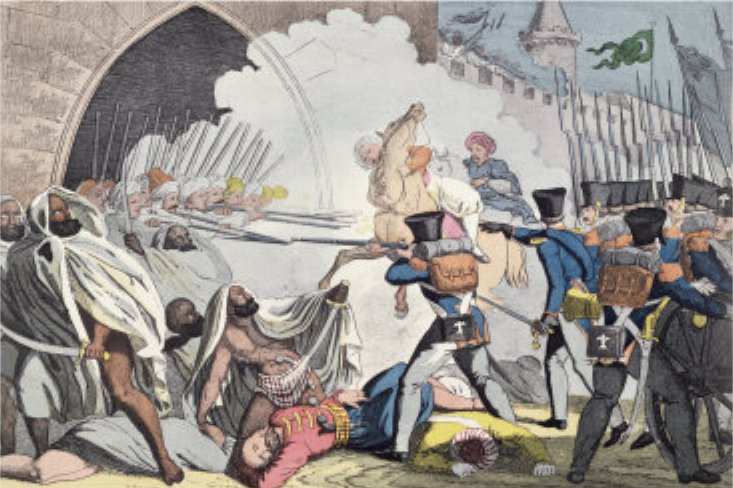
Fighting at the gates of Algiers in 1830.

The 80 inmates from the two brigs L'Aventure and Le Sylène who survived expected each day to be put to death and eliminated by the janissaries of Algiers, when on 5 July 1830, the capture of Algiers took place and put an end to their suffering in the prison.

Marshal de Bourmont then came in person to the Algiers prison to congratulate the two officers, Bruat and d'Assigny, and their sailors for their attitude which had made it possible to survive until their rescue.

When the sailors from the Le Sylène and L'Aventure brigs saw the French soldiers arrive under the command of General Charles-Marie Denys de Damrémont (1783-1837), they received them in their prison as liberators. When King Charles X arrived on the La Provence vessel at the port of Algiers, his first care was to demand the release of the prisoners of Le Sylène and L'Aventure, which he then immediately had sent to France.

== Gallery ==
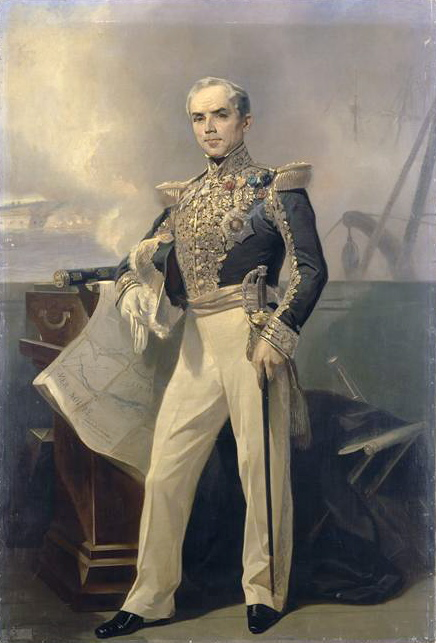
Armand Joseph Bruat

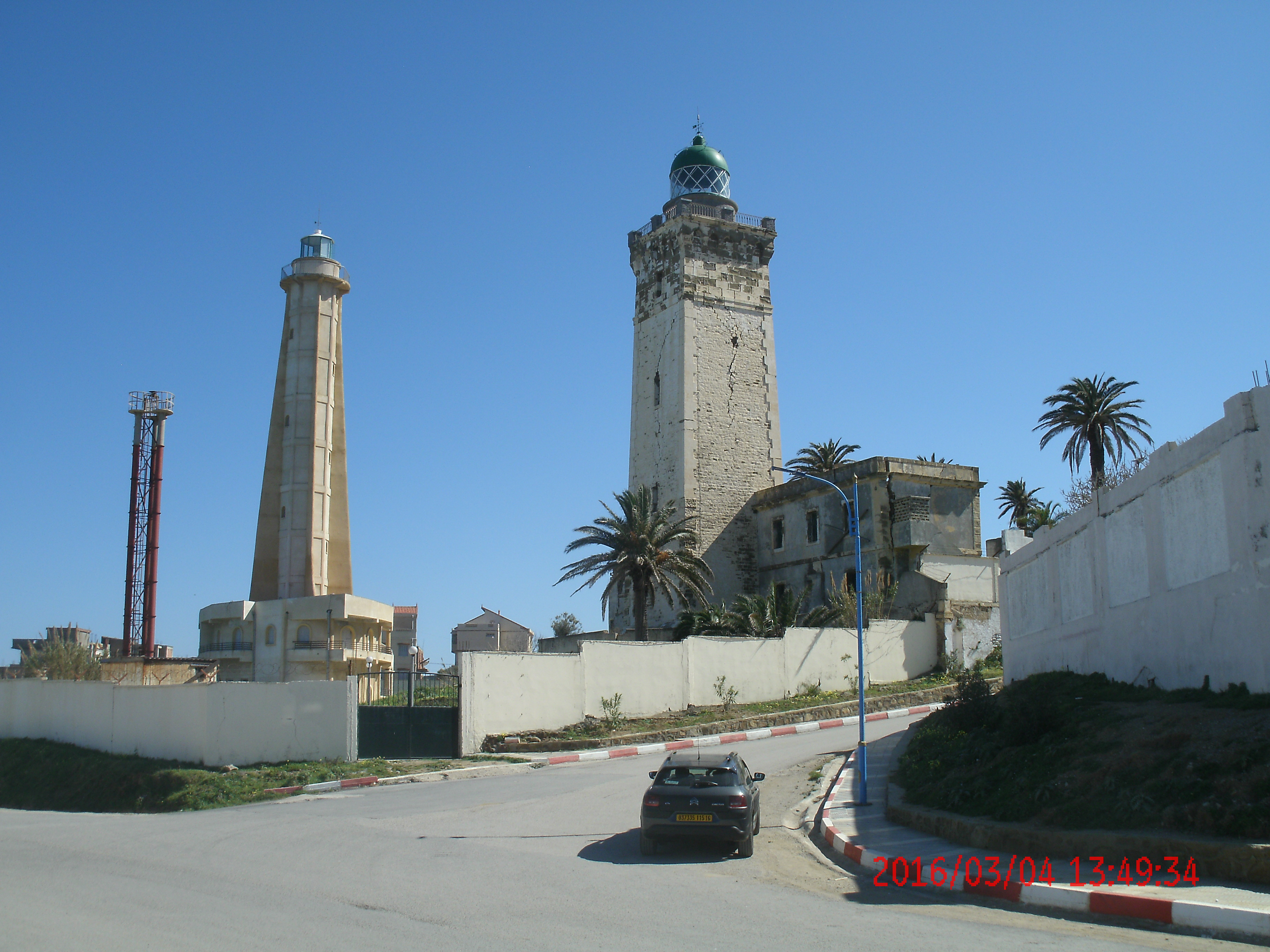
Cape Bengut

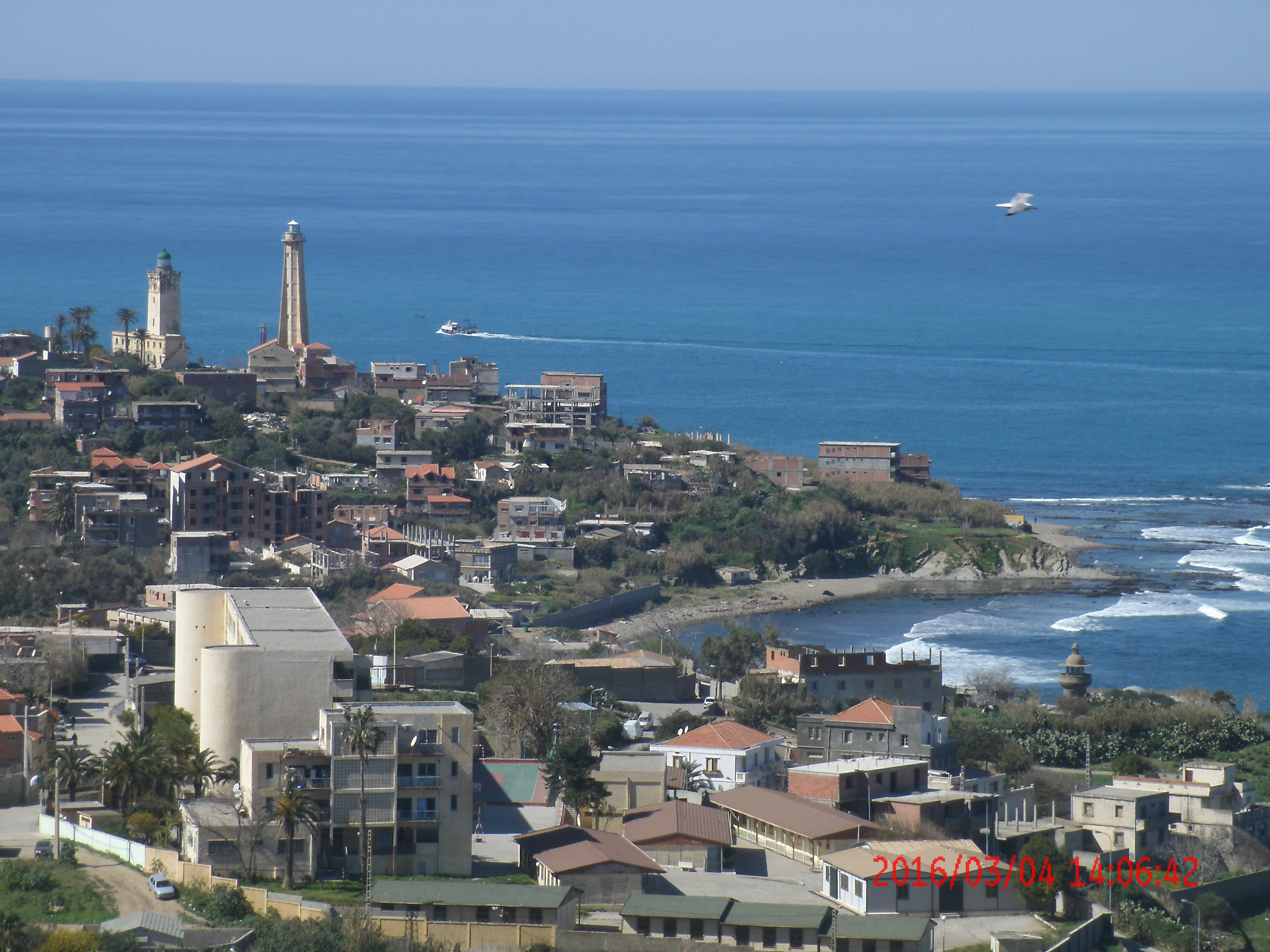
Cape Bengut

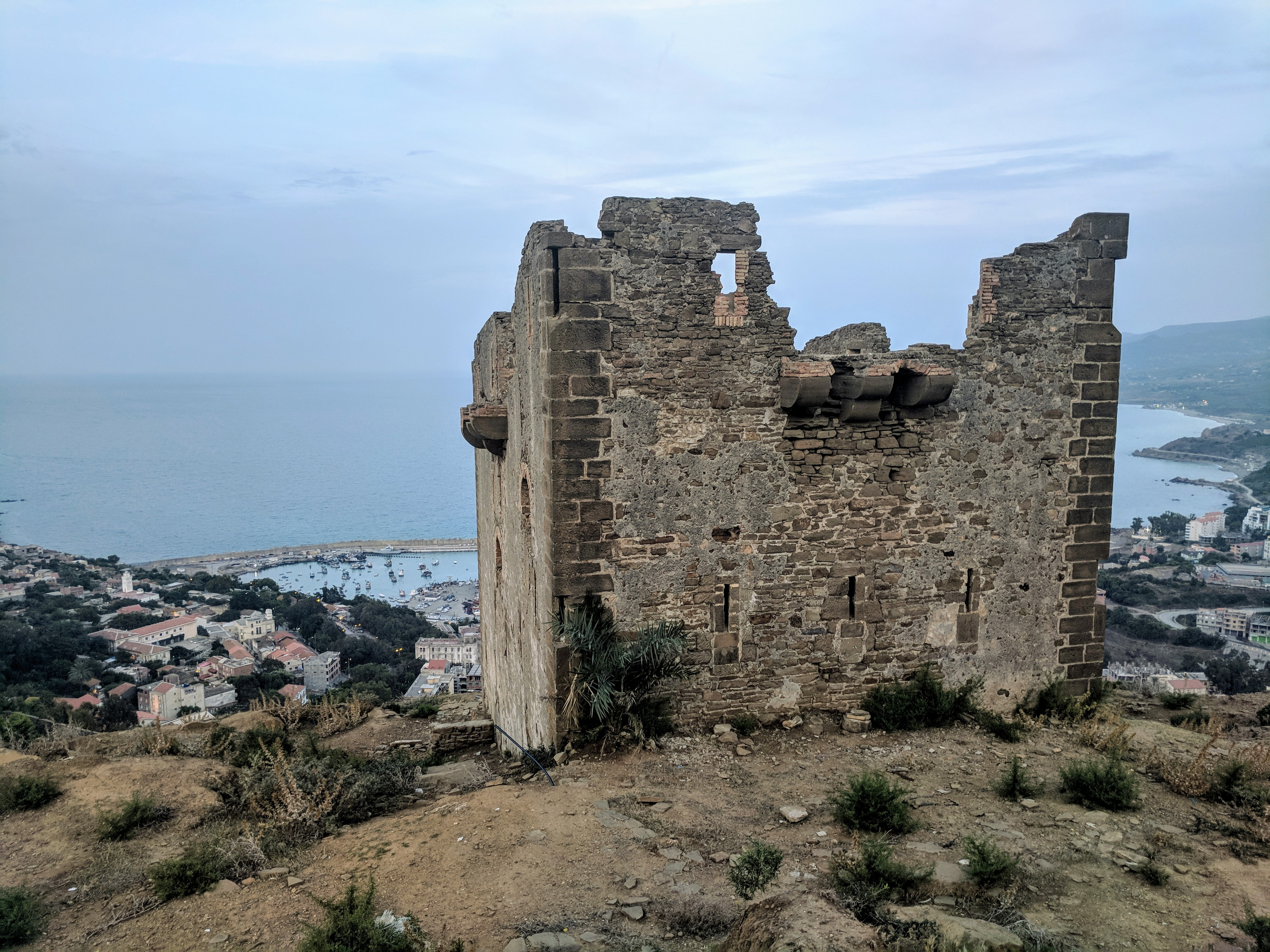
Qubba of Sidi Soussan in Dellys

== See also ==
- French conquest of Algeria
- Ottoman Algeria
- Hussein Dey
- Ibrahim Agha
- Kingdom of France
- Charles X
- Jules de Polignac
- Emmanuel Halgan
- Louis Auguste Victor de Ghaisne de Bourmont
- Félix-Ariel d'Assigny
- Armand Joseph Bruat
- Guy-Victor Duperré
