= Battle of Staouéli =

Part of the French conquest of Algiers (1830)

- Part of the invasion of Algiers
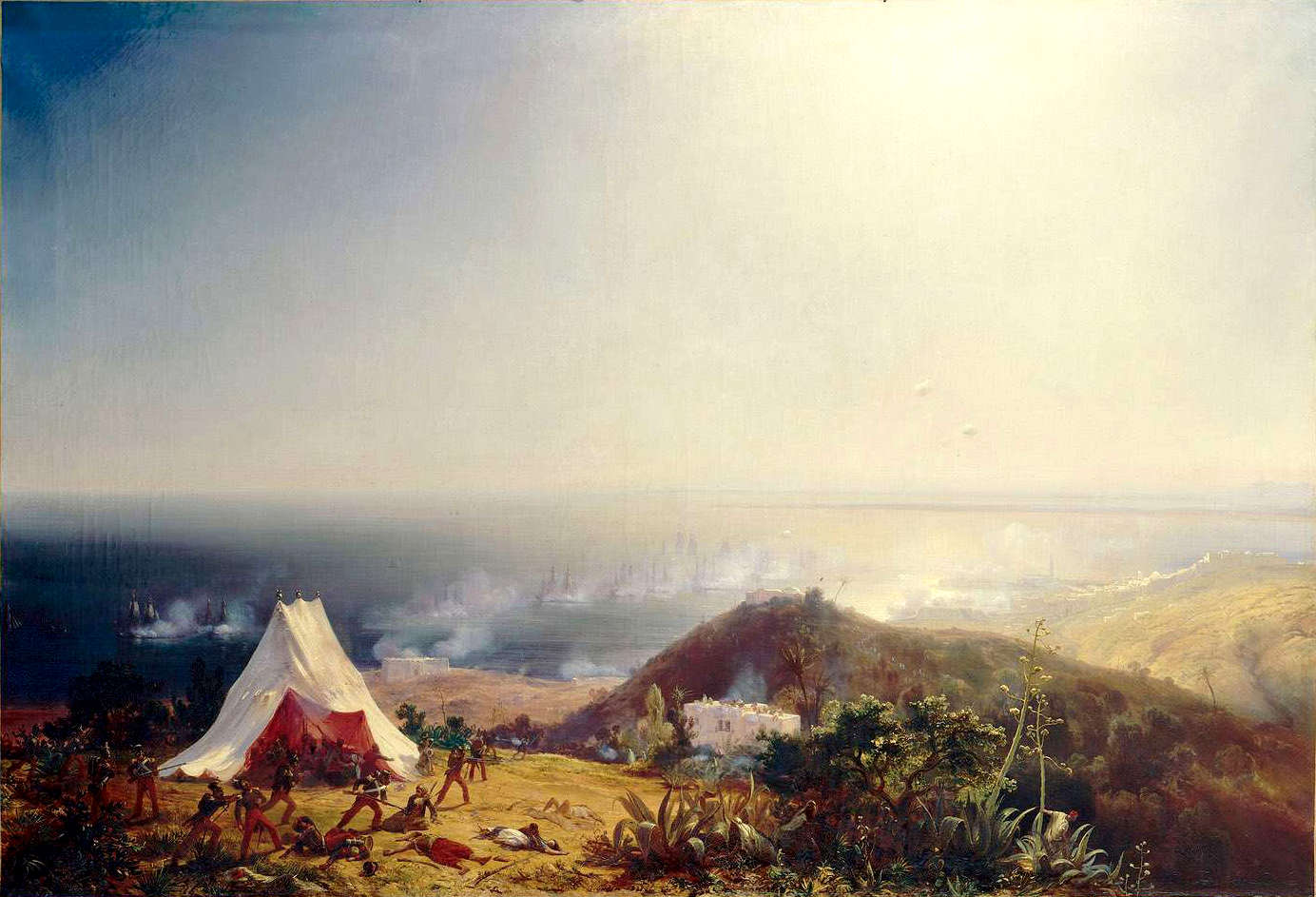
- Attack on Algiers by sea, 29 June 1830; Théodore Gudin, 1831
Date	18 June 1830 – 19 June 1830
Location	Staouéli, Algeria 36°N 2°E
Result	French victory

Belligerents
Kingdom of France	Deylik of Algiers

Commanders and leaders
Victor de Bourmont; Pierre Berthezène	Ibrahim Agha; Mostéfa Boumezrag

Strength
20,000	25,000–50,000

Casualties and losses
57 dead, 473 wounded	Over 4,000

Battle of Staoueli (18 June 1830 – 19 June 1830) was a battle between the Kingdom of France and the Regency of Algiers in western Algiers while France was trying to take control over the capital.

== Prelude ==
As French forces were slowly disembarking their troops and artillery at Sidi Fredj, a large army composed of the Regency's three beyliks as well as many Berber and Kabyle tribes gathered in a large camp on the nearby plateau of Staouéli. Algerian forces, numbering over 50,000 in total, were composed of 5,000 Janissaries, 10,000 Moors from the city of Algiers, 30,000 men from the Beys of Oran, Titteri and Medea, and 10,000 Kabyle warriors from the mountains.

Having been promised a swift and crushing victory by Ibrahim Agha, Hussein Dey came to the camp with his wives and his court to witness it in person.

== The battle ==
By 18 June, the French had disembarked two out of the three divisions that composed their Expeditionary Army.

On 19 June at 4:30 am, Algerian forces came down the plateau in mass though a thick mist and attacked French outposts The contingent under the Bey of Constantine advanced on two French brigades under General Damrémont and General Monck d'Uzer, but the Algerians were soon repulsed by a bayonet charge of the 15th of the Line and by artillery fire. The main Algerian contingent, under the personal command of Agha, then attacked the 28th of the Line, on the French left. The attack was briefly successful, but General D'Arcine then ordered the 29th of the Line to come to the help of the 28th. Upon seeing the reinforcement, the Algerians hesitated and retreated as the French launched a general bayonet charge. As the retreating Algerian forces had distanced themselves from French forces, French warships opened fire on them, increasing the chaos of their flight.

Meanwhile, on the right, the 37th of the Line of General Achard's brigade engaged in ferocious fighting against janissaries, who eventually retreated, albeit slowly and orderedly. As Achard's troops kept advancing up the hill, General Loverdo ordered two of his brigades, under Damrémont and Monck d'Uzer, to start advancing on the left. Kabyle skirmishers, who had placed themselves in bushes after the initial retreat of the Bey of Constantine, are forced to retreat across the as French troops of the 6th and 49th of the Line advanced upon them. Despite the withdrawal of the Algerians, it took the French quite a while to get up the hill, as they were forced to move the artillery on foot due to none of the horses having been disembarked yet.

By 7:00 French columns of Damrémont and Monck d'Uzer's brigades arrived on the plateau. From here they could see the tents of the Algerian camp in the distance. As large groups of horsemen were gathering near the camp, the French formed infantry squares. However at that moment, Bourmont, who initially didn't give the battle much attention, finally arrived on the battlefield and, under general Berthezène's advice, ordered to advance on Algerian positions... Three regiments under general Achard marched on an Algerian battery. The artillery crews fled as French troops fired at them through embrasures, allowing the French to capture it. As the general French advance was focused on the left, a large group of Algerian horsemen gathered on the right to attack the weaker French position, but they were soon scattered by General De la Hitte's massed artillery fire. At that point, Algerian forces were retreating toward their camp, and the retreat soon turned into a general rout as the French columns charged toward them. Algerian forces disorderly scattered in all directions, leaving their belongings behind in the general panic.

The French then placed artillery in front of the camp, as a precaution against a potential counter-attack that never came. By 1:00 pm, the last Algerian forces had disappeared from the French's sight. The battle had lasted for about 8 hours since it had begun at 4:00 am. General Barthezène's division had lost 44 killed and 334 wounded, and General Loverdo's division 13 killed and 129 wounded.

== Aftermath ==
The French captured vast amounts of riches, weapons, food and livestock that had been left behind by Algerian forces during their hasty retreat. That evening, mutton from the captured livestock was distributed to French troops, who had not eaten any meat since their departure from Toulon a month earlier.

Despite this crushing victory, Bourmont refused to make any advance toward Algiers until all French troops and artillery had disembarqued. Hussein Dey spent the next four days rallying back his forces that had scattered after their defeat, and on 24 June the Algerians came to fight the French again at the Battle of Sidi Khalef.
