= 1830 in Algeria =

- Decades: 1830s; 1840s; 1850s
- See also: History of Algeria; List of years in Algeria

Events from the year 1830 in Algeria.

== Events ==
- July 5 – France invades Algiers.
