= Ibrahim Agha =

Last Agha of the Regency of Algiers

Ibrahim Agha Agha
- دالي إبراهيم
- Spouse: Unnamed daughter of Hussein Dey
- Military career
- Allegiance: Deylik of Algiers
- Branch: Algerine land forces
- Rank: Agha al-Mahalla
- Conflicts: Invasion of Algiers in 1830: Battle of Staouéli; Battle of Sidi-Khalef

Ibrahim Agha was the final Agha al-Mahalla of the Odjak of Algiers, the commander-in-chief of the Algerian forces during the Invasion of Algiers, and the son-in-law of Hussein Dey.

== Personal life ==
He married Hussein Dey's daughter. He was appointed as Agha (general) in 1828, after the previous one, Yahya, suffered severe defeats while attempting to pacify rebellious Kabyle tribes. He possessed a large villa in the centre of Algiers.

== Invasion of Algiers ==
In 1830 France invaded Algeria after a naval blockade lasting for three years. Hussein appointed Ibrahim as the commander-in-chief of his forces, which consisted of contingents from the Beylik of Constantine, Titteri, and Oran, and the Janissary contingent known as th Odjak of Algiers. He advised Hussein to let the French land in Algeria, to make sure that "not one of them would return to their homeland". On June 4 the French army landed at Sidi Fredj, and the ill-prepared forces of the Regency showed minimal resistance, engaging only through small skirmishes and cannon fire. French casualties were little, amounting to 32 dead and wounded, while the Algerian side lost many artillery pieces, but ultimately also suffered minimal casualties.

Setting up his camp on the top of the plateau surrounding the town of Staouéli, he reinforced his army with artillery setting up positions in a local fort. His army consisted of up to 40,000 warriors according to French sources, however the real number may have been lower. The French at the time were waiting for additional equipment to arrive, since most of their cavalry and heavy artillery were still located in their ships. Ibrahim Agha ordered an assault on French positions, starting with large scale artillery fire and small arms fire followed by a massed cavalry charged however the more disciplined French forces were able to resist and push them back, eventually attacking and taking the Algerian camp, forcing Ibrahim Agha and his forces to retreat.

Following the defeat and fearing punishment for his failure he reorganized his remaining forces and attempted one last engagement with the French near Algiers, however he also suffered a major loss in this battle, after which he was removed from command.
