= Hamat al-Majd =

Song
- Language: Arabic
- Written: 1981
- Genre: Patriotic
- Composer: Sharif Qurtubi
- Lyricist: Omar Al-Barnawi

Hamat al-Majd (هَامَاتُ الْمَجْدِ), also known as Min Ajlika 'Ishna Ya Watani (مِنْ أَجْلِكَ عِشْنَا يَا وَطَنِي; "For Your Sake, We Lived, My Homeland"), is an Algerian patriotic song written by Algerian poet Omar Al-Barnawi in 1981. The music was composed by Sharif Qurtubi. The anthem expresses pride in Algeria, patriotism, national identity, and the sacrifices made by Algerians during the resistance and the struggle for independence. It received the award for Best National Anthem in Algeria in 1982.

The song is performed at national celebrations, including events commemorating Algerian Independence Day and the Algerian War of Independence. Algeria's public television has also broadcast a performance of the song.

== Lyrics ==
The text shown in gray is repeated only during the performance of the anthem and is not part of the poetic text.

﴾هَامَاتُ الْمَجْدِ﴿

—عُمَرُ الْبَرْنَاوِيُّ—

مِنْ أَجْلِكَ عِشْنَا يَا وَطَنِي\\ نَفْدِي بِالرُّوحِ أَرَاضِينَا
قَدْ كُنَّا أَمْسِ عَمَالِقَةً\\ فِي الْحَرْبِ نُذِلُّ أَعْدَاءَنَا

(× 2 تُعَادُ مَرَّتَيْنِ)

وَإِنَّا الْيَوْمَ عَمَالِقَةٌ\\ فِي السِّلْمِ حُمَاةُ مَبَادِئِنَا

مِنْ أَجْلِكَ يَا، مِنْ أَجْلِكَ يَا، يَا وَطَنِي

أَبْطَالًا كُنَّا لَا نَرْضَى\\ غَيْرَ الْأَمْجَادِ تُحَيِّينَا
نَزْهُو بِالْمَاضِي فِي ثِقَةٍ\\ وَالْحَاضِرُ يَعْلُو مَاضِينَا
فَجَّرْنَا الثَّوْرَةَ مِنْ أَزَلٍ\\ سَجِّلْ يَا دَهْرُ مَعَالِينَا
وَالنَّصْرُ الْأَكْبَرُ كَانَ لَنَا\\ مَجْدًا مِنْ صُنْعِ أَيْدِينَا

مِنْ أَجْلِكَ يَا، مِنْ أَجْلِكَ يَا، يَا وَطَنِي

جَيْشُ التَّحْرِيرِ وَجَبْهَتُهُ\\ كَانَا ضَوْأَيْنِ بِدَاجِينَا
قَالَا فِي الْبَدْءِ كَرَامَتُنَا\\ وَالشَّعْبُ يَسُودُ هُنَا فِينَا
خَيْرَاتُ الشَّعْبِ نُقَسِّمُهَا\\ فِينَا بِالْعَدْلِ مَوَازِينَا
وَالدَّعْمُ الْمُطْلَقُ نَبْذُلُهُ\\ لِلشَّعْبِ الرَّافِضِ تَدْجِينَا

مِنْ أَجْلِكَ يَا، مِنْ أَجْلِكَ يَا، يَا وَطَنِي

يَا سَائِلُ عُرْبٌ مِلَّتُنَا\\ دِينُ الْإِسْلَامِ يُؤَاخِينَا
هَامَاتُ الْمَجْدِ مَرَابِعُنَا\\ وَاللَّهُ الْحَافِظُ يَحْمِينَا

(× 2 تُعَادُ مَرَّتَيْنِ ثُمَّ)

مِنْ أَجْلِكَ يَا، مِنْ أَجْلِكَ يَا، يَا وَطَنِي

مِنْ أَجْلِكَ عِشْنَا يَا وَطَنِي\\ نَفْدِي بِالرُّوحِ أَرَاضِينَا

(يُعَادُ الْجُزْءُ الْأَوَّلُ وَيُخْتَتَمُ بِهَا هَذَا النَّشِيدُ.)

== See also ==
- Kassaman — the national anthem of Algeria
- Algerian nationalism
- Algerian War
- Culture of Algeria
