= Algerian popular resistance against French invasion =

Popular revolutions against the occupation

- Part of the French conquest of Algeria
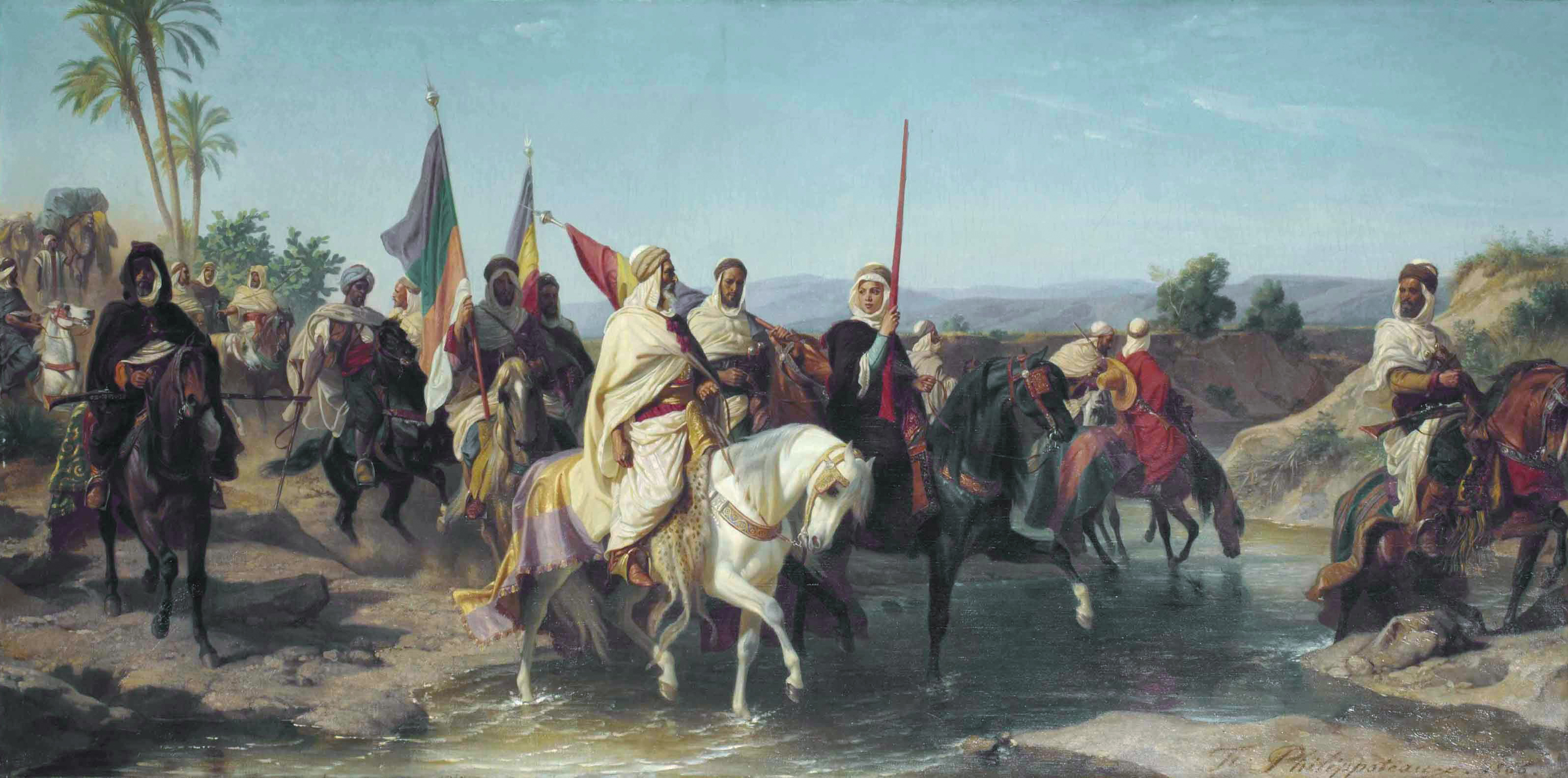
Date	1830–1903
Location	Algeria
Result	French victory

Belligerents
Emirate of Mascara; Beylik of Constantine; Kingdom of Beni Abbas; Awlad Sidi Shaykh; Kel Ahaggar	France

The Algerian popular resistance against French invasion refers to resistance in Algeria against the French conquest, which began with the invasion of Algiers in 1830 and lasted until 1903.

== French-Algerian War 1681–88 ==
The French-Algerian War (1681-1688) was part of a wider campaign by France against the Barbary Pirates in the 1680s.

== Resistance movements during the French conquest of Algeria ==
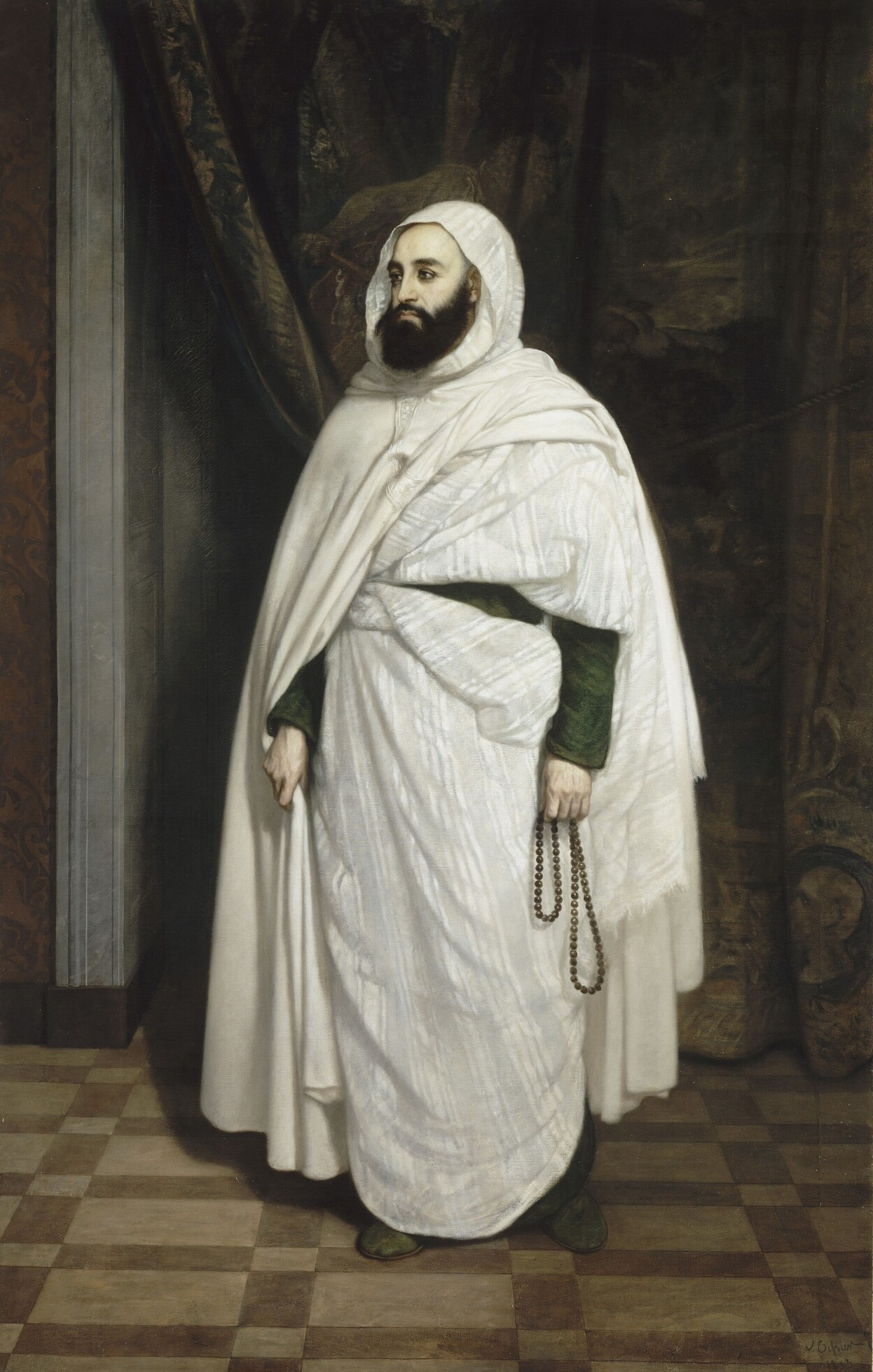
Emir Abdelkader

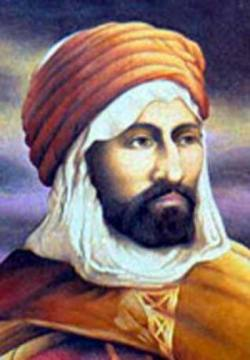
Cheikh Mokrani

The French conquest of Algeria took place between 1830 and 1903. In 1827, an argument between Hussein Dey, the ruler of the Deylik of Algiers, and the French consul escalated into a naval blockade of Algiers, following which France invaded and quickly seized Algiers in 1830, and seized other coastal communities. Amid internal political strife in France, decisions were repeatedly taken to retain control of the territory, and additional military forces were brought in over the following years to quell resistance in the interior of the country.

=== Mitidja Resistance ===
When the Algerian capital fell to the French army on 7 June 1830, a new phase of modern Algerian history began, the period of French colonialism.

This is because the fall of the Deylical rule led to a political vacuum and as a result, both political and military leaders appeared in the countryside of the Mitidja region and took upon themselves the task of confronting the French occupation.

The Mitidja is a large plain surrounding the Algerian capital of Algiers. The prospects of French occupation relied on the control of this area as it was a strategic entry into the Algerian interior. The Mitidja resistance was the first armed popular resistance of Algerians against the French presence, which was generalized throughout the country and continued until the beginning of the 20th century.

=== Abdelkader Resistance ===
Emir Abdelkader was an ideal nominee for Algerian resistance against the French. He was a man committed to his Shari’a faith and conduct of the jihad, and soon into his rise and maintenance of power as a figure head of the resistance he coined the nickname Amir al-Mu’minin (Commander of the Believers).

Initially, the young Abdelkader took over from his father who was leading the Algerian opposition against the newly arrived French troops in the Oran province. Shortly after his succession to power, the Desmichels Treaty of 1834 was signed between Abdelkader and the French occupiers. The treaty was composed of two parts; one being the official content consisting of the French conditions, and the second consisting of Abdelkader's demands from the French. The result of this was granting official permission and recognition of Abdelkaders sovereignty over the Oran province, in the northwest of Algeria. This gave Abdelkader a good foundation of expanding his sphere of control, as following this he created his own state in opposition to the French rule. In this new state, Abdelkader was the sole leader and organised an army of around 2,000 men.

Whilst in power, Abdelkader made it a goal of his to attempt at resisting French occupation in other provinces, such as Algiers. However, the French showed no desire to back down from this fight. Abdelkader saw these actions as a cause for war. Consequently, in July 1839 he assembled the principal chiefs of all of the ethnic groups in the country and declared a conditional jihad. He toured the country calling for a jihad and advancing the need for preparation for war – commanding money, men and arms. By the end of 1839, Abdelkader had made an official declaration of jihad. A war of eight years followed.

Between 1832 and 1839 Abdelkader successfully created a state, which occupied almost two-thirds of the country at its peak, and limited the French occupancy in the three coastal regions which held much importance to both the French and the Algerians.

=== Ahmed Bey Resistance ===
Ahmed Bey, the last Bey of Constantine, led the Algerian popular resistance against the French in the east of Algeria with the aid of Hussein Pasha. As the head of state, he modernised the army which aided in his fierce defense of Constantine against the French army. In 1837, Constantine was besieged by the French, forcing Ahmed Bey to flee to the Aures Mountains where he continued to direct the resistance until 1848 when he was captured by the colonisers.

=== Mokrani Kabyle Revolt ===
The Kabylia region had always been highly independent, able to maintain their own institutions under Ottoman rule. However, by 1830 the French had successfully infiltrated the region and its peoples, despite heavy resistance by locals. The dire conditions in the region, such as famine and the French pitting different ethnic groups against each other by treating some better than others, led to the Kabyle uprisings. The unrest continued in the region as late as the Mokrani Revolt in 1871.

The Mokrani Revolt was led by Cheikh Mokrani, a Kabyle dignitary. The catalyst for the revolt was the mutiny of a Spahi – a member of the Algerian cavalry under French rule – in 1871, after his refusal to be deported to France to fight in the Franco-Prussian War. Mokrani also wanted to assert autonomy from the French and decided to gather a war council in order to achieve this. The revolt began in April 1871 with approximately 150,000 Kabyles joining the rebellion, severely threatening the colonial operation. It ended in June 1872 when the leading figure of the revolt by that time, Boumezrag, was captured by the French. The rebellion extended through most of Algeria and was the last major revolt prior to the start of the War of Liberation, which led to independence.

== Algerian Resistance during the French Algeria ==
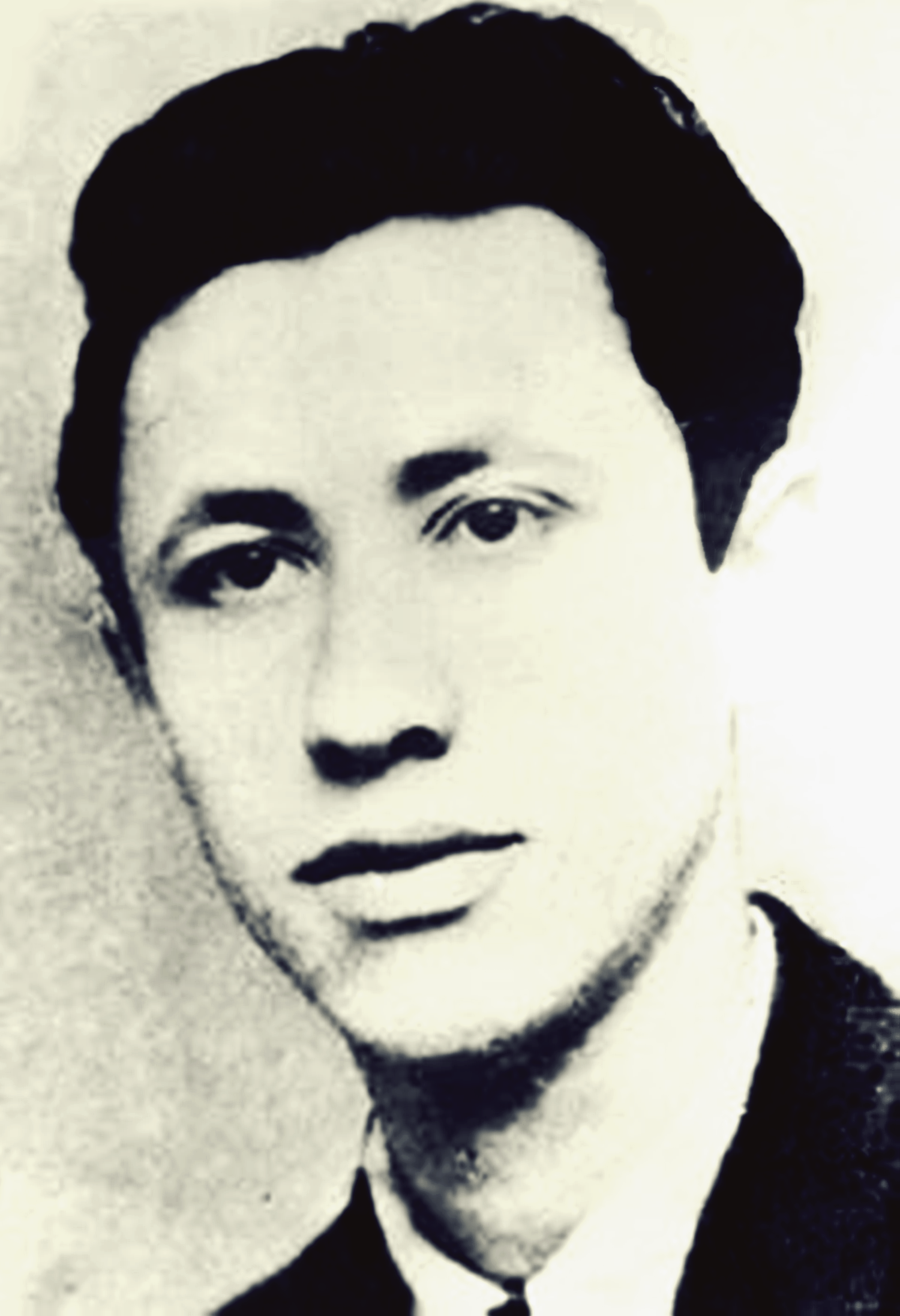
Mohamed Belouizdad

French Algeria refers to the colonial rule of France over Algeria, which began in 1830 with the invasion of Algiers and lasted until the Algerian War of Independence concluded in 1962. While the administration of Algeria changed significantly over the 132 years of French rule, the Mediterranean coastal region of Algeria, housing the vast majority of its population, was administered as an integral part of France from 1848 until independence.

=== Everyday nonviolent forms of resistance (1830s-1950s) ===
Nonviolent forms of resistance regarding the everyday life were a constant in the Algerian popular struggle against the French occupation.

Right after the French invasion in 1830, a form of collective resistance was the Algerian mass emigration to other Muslim countries. This migration, which was connected to the Muslim hijrah, was clearly recognized as resistance against the imposition of a non-Muslim authority and, later on, of military conscription.

Opposition to take part in social programs imposed by the French, refusal to send the children to French schools and boycotts were among the non-violent actions adopted by the population to contrast French domination.

While in the public sphere Algerian culture was oppressed, houses and religious sites became the new places of resistance as spaces where cultural identities and practices were protected and reinforced.

=== Algerian nationalism ===
Algerian nationalism has been shaped by Algerian-French dichotomies; tensions between the French and Algerian language and culture. It was inspired by people such as Ben Badis and Djamila Bouhired, who were two of the many opposing French colonial rule in Algeria.

=== Movement for the Triumph of Democratic Liberties ===
When the Algerian People's Party (Parti du Peuple Algerien, PPA) was declared outlawed after the Sétif protests, the Movement for the Triumph of Democratic Liberties (MTDL) was created in October 1946 to replace it. This new nationalist party was still led by Messali Hadj, who initially asked for an election boycott. However, after Messali Hadj was released from prison in 1946, MTDL candidates participated in the first elections for the National Assembly of the newly constituted French Fourth Republic and obtained a third of the 15 seats designated for Muslim Algerians.

This move was criticized by nationalist members and in 1947 along with the official MTDL, still fitting into the existing political colonial framework, a secret paramilitary group, the Special Organisation (OS), was created to pursue the fight for independence. However, internal fractures and contradictions were emerging. Many young people joined the OS to fight colonialism, and at the same time Arabism and Messali's leadership was increasingly questioned, especially by Berber members.

This led to the split in 1953, between “Centralists”, urging for revolution, and Messalists, refusing to start an armed action in the short term.

=== Special Organisation ===
After the Sétif massacre, many Algerians realized the impossibility of a peaceful change and transition of power.“Self-determination” became the common goal of Algerian nationalism, with many calling for confrontations with the French, recognizing the need for guerrilla warfare to achieve independence. At the end of the year, the MTDL leadership agreed on creating the Special Organisation. The Special Organisation (Organisation Special, OS) was a secret paramilitary organisation, founded by Mohamed Belouizdad of the Movement for the Triumph of Democratic Liberties in 1947. In the following years, they prepared for armed insurrection against France with armed attacks, like the one to the Oran Post Office in 1949, to fund their operations.

=== National Liberation Front (FLN) ===
With Messali losing his prominent role as Algeria nationalist leader and tension growing in the MTDL, the “Centralists” faction of the movement formed the Revolutionary Committee of Unity and Action (Comité Révolutionnaire d’Unité et d’Action, CRUA). The movement then became the National Liberation Front (Front de Libération Nationale, FLN), which launched the War of Independence in 1954.

=== Algerian Revolution ===
The Algerian War was fought between France and the Algerian National Liberation Front from 1954 to 1962, which led to Algeria winning its independence from France. An important decolonization war, it was a complex conflict characterized by guerrilla warfare and the use of torture.

=== Women's resistance ===
Approximately 11,000 Algerian women participated in the Algerian War, especially joining the FNL.

In particular, during the Battle of Algiers (1956-1957), women would dress up as European and unhindered place bombs in sites frequented by European colons. One of them was Djamila Bouhired (1935- ), who became a symbol of the Algerian struggle for liberation from the French when she was arrested and tortured under terrorism charges.

== See also ==
- History of Algeria
- Deylik of Algeria
- Mitidja resistance
- Emir Abdelkader resistance
- Kabylia resistance
- French Algeria
- Declaration of 1 November 1954
- Algerian War
