= Jacob Cohen Bakri =

French consul (1763–1836)

Jacob Cohen Bakri (born in Algiers in 1763; died Paris Nov. 23, 1836) was an influential businessperson and political figure in Algiers. He was involved in the Fly-whisk Incident which led to the French conquest of Algeria.

Immensely rich, he is reported by the Jewish Encyclopedia to have been French consul in Algiers under the Bourbon Restoration; however, most other sources give the consul as Pierre Deval. In 1827, under Charles X, the consul negotiated with the Dey, Hasan, in reference to a claim made by the French government. In the course of this negotiation, the consul, defending French interests, was insulted by the Dey. The French government regarded this as a national affront, and declared war, the result of which was the conquest of Algiers and the banishment of the dey. Leaving Algiers at the outbreak of the war, Bakri settled in Paris, where he was continually annoyed by his creditors, by reason of his inability to avail himself of a debt due to him from the Spanish government, amounting to 35,000,000 francs.

He was Jewish.
