= Armand Joseph Bruat =

French admiral (1796–1855)

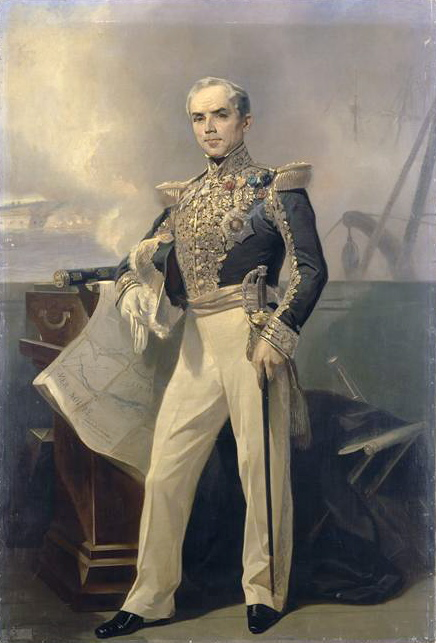
- Armand Joseph Bruat
- Born: 26 May 1796; Colmar, France
- Died: 19 November 1855 (aged 59); Messina, Sicily
- Burial place: Père Lachaise Cemetery
- Military career
- Allegiance: First French Empire; Bourbon Restoration (France) July Monarchy; French Second Republic; Second French Empire
- Branch: French Navy
- Service years: 1811–1855
- Rank: Admiral of France
- Conflicts: Conquest of Algeria; Shipwreck of Dellys; Crimean War
- Awards: Legion of Honour (Grand Officier)

Armand Joseph Bruat (1797 – 19 November 1855) was a French admiral who served as the administrator of the Marquesas Islands in French Polynesia. He fought in multiple engagements in the Mediterranean.

== Early life ==
Armand Joseph Bruat was born in Alsace in 1797.

== Career ==
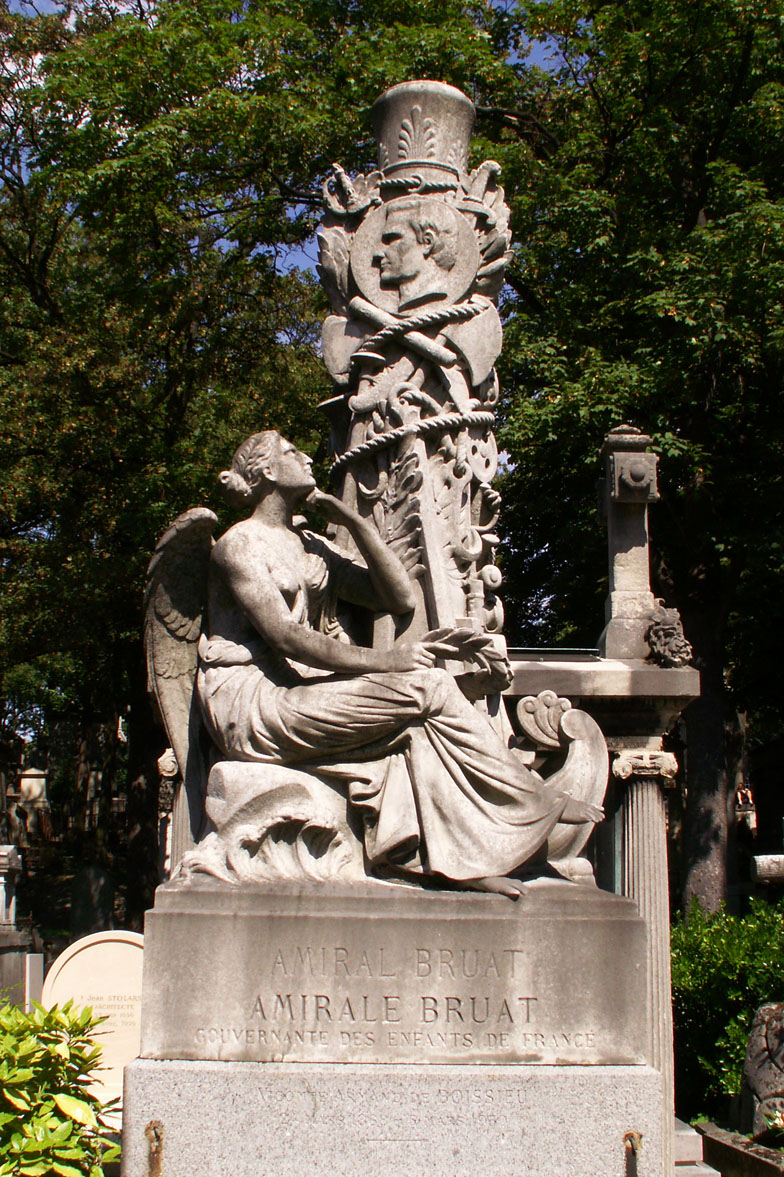
Grave of Admiral Joseph Armand Bruat at the Père Lachaise Cemetery, sculpted by Hippolyte Maindron.

Bruat joined the French military in 1811. Aboard the brig Le Hussard, he campaigned in Copenhagen, Brazil, and the West Indies. He started his service on the corvette L'Espérance in 1817, and served as ensign. He was a maneuvers officer on the Conquérant, Foudroyant, and La Diane from 1819 to 1824.

Bruat was present at the Battle of Navarino and was decorated his conduct in the battle. He was given command of the brig Silène in 1828, and captured multiple ships along the cost of Algeria. In 1830, he and 200 crew men were shipwrecked on the Algerian coast and 110 of them were massacred. Bruat and the survivors were taken captive. In May 1838, Bruat was made captain of a ship and placed under the command of Admiral Julien Pierre Anne Lalande.

The Marquesas Islands were annexed by France in 1842. Bruat was called to the Marquesas Islands in 1843, and placed in charge of the naval subdivision. A royal ordinance on 28 April 1843 gave Bruat the same draconian powers given to French generals in Algeria. Bruat's government suffered from financial shortages as he only had 200,000 francs for general expenses.

== Death ==
Bruat died of cholera in November 1855 while returning to France from the Crimean War. A portrait of Bruat was commissioned by Emperor Napoleon III for the Musée de l'Histoire de France in 1856.

== Works cited ==
=== Books ===
- Mullié, Charle (1851). Biographie des célébrités militaires des armées de terre et de mer de 1789 à 1850 [Biographies of military celebrities from the army and navy from 1789 to 1850] (in French). Poignavant et Compagnie.
- Newbury, Colin (1980). Tahiti Nui: Change and Survival in French Polynesia, 1767–1945. University of Hawai'i Press. ISBN 9780824880323.

=== Web ===
- "Admiral Armand Joseph Bruat (1796-1855)". Royal Collection. Archived from the original on 20 November 2026.
- "Armand Joseph Bruat, Admiral of France (1796-1855)". Ministry of Culture. Archived from the original on 20 November 2026.
