= French blockade of Algiers =

1827–1830 blockade of the Regency of Algiers by France

- Part of the French conquest of Algeria
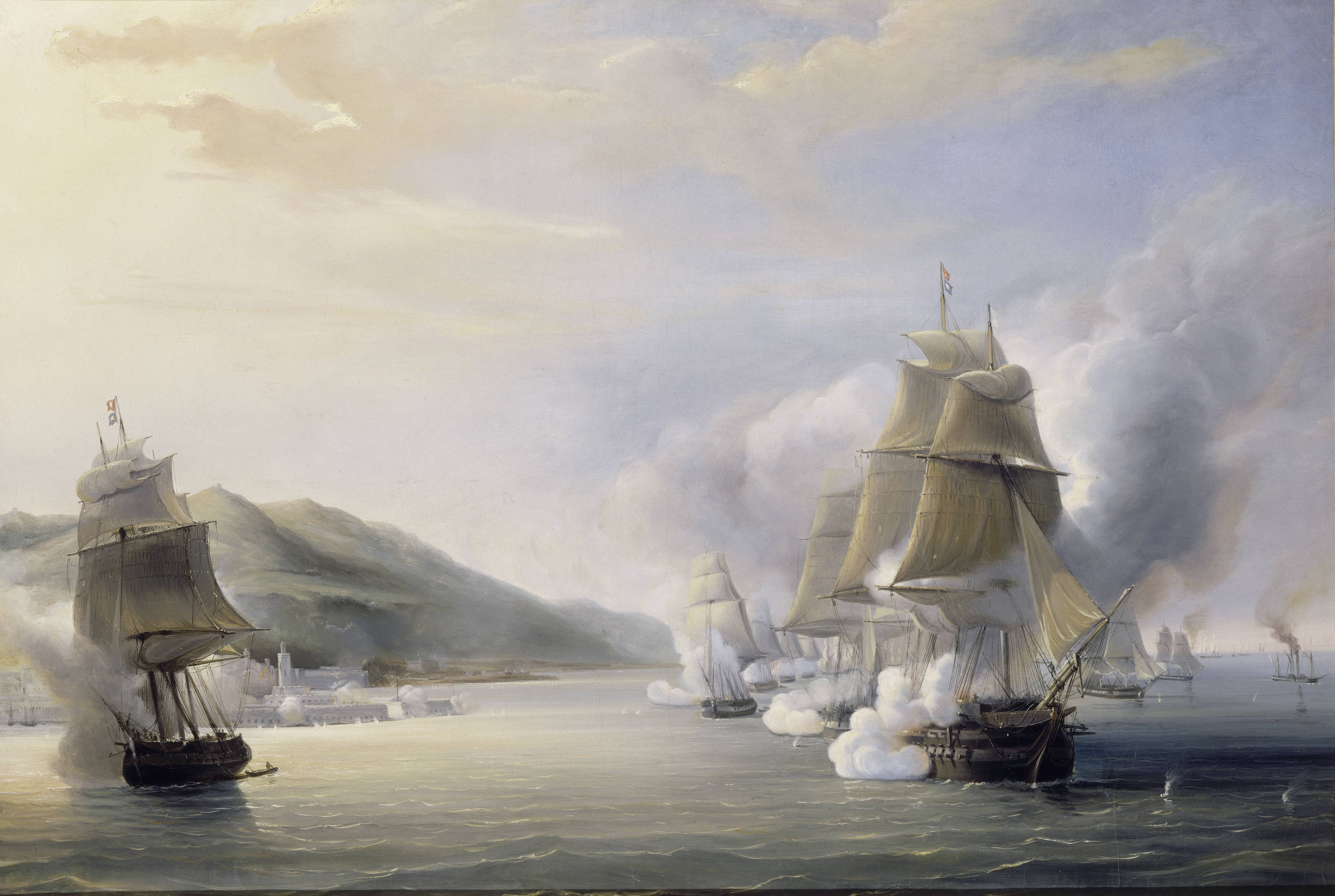
- Bombardment of Algiers in 1830
| Date | 16 June 1827 – 14 June 1830 (2 years, 11 months, 4 weeks and 1 day) |
| Location | Mediterranean Sea, off the coast of Algiers |
| Result | French failure: Failure to cut Algiers' trade or restrict Algerine freedom of action; French invasion of Algiers in 1830 |

Belligerents
| Kingdom of France | Regency of Algiers |

Commanders and leaders
| Charles X | Hussein Dey |

Strength
| 7–18 vessels | Unknown |

The French blockade of Algiers was a three-year-long naval blockade imposed by France on the Regency of Algiers. It was imposed on 16 June 1827 as a result of the fly-whisk incident. Intended to cut off the Regency's commercial relations and restrict its navy and corsairs' operations, the French failed to achieve either objective. Throughout the blockade, France planned its ultimate invasion of Algiers in June 1830.

== Background ==
On 30 April 1827, foreign consuls and diplomatic agents gathered in Algiers for a conference with the Dey of Algiers, Hussein Dey. During this, Hussein Dey asked the French consul whether France intended to meet the debt settlement and whether it had begun transferring the funds. When he heard that no progress had yet been made on the issue, he was angered and struck the French consul in the face with the handle of a fly-whisk and ordered him out of his audience, calling him "an insolent infidel." News of the incident spread fast becoming an outrage in France where the incident promoted calls to restore French honor. This was rooted in Algerine demands that the French pay their debts contracted in 1799 when they purchased supplies to feed their soldiers during the Napoleonic invasion of Egypt and Syria. The Dey, refusing to pay reparations for the insult, possibly encouraged by the British consul, was faced with a French blockade from 16 June 1827.

== Blockade ==
=== Blockade attempt ===
France ordered a naval blockade on Algerine ports on 16 June 1827. Believing that Algiers could not sustain a long blockade, the French issued numerous ultimatums, increasing the number of blockading vessels from seven to twelve to eighteen. Despite this, the blockade proved futile, as the French were unable to weaken the Regency economically by cutting off its trade or by restricting the movement of the Algerine navy and corsairs. The blockade was also intended to bring famine to Algiers and bring about popular unrest to force Hussein Dey into negotiating. Several Algerine corsairs evaded the blockade and directly threatened French trade. The Dey refused to submit to French demands. In August 1829, attempting to save face, France asked the Dey to send a diplomat to Paris to reach a ceasefire. The Dey outright rejected and responded by firing cannon balls at the flagship of the blockade's commander, preventing him from even landing. The French felt compelled to act against Algiers.

In response to the French blockade and threats, the Dey ordered the destruction of French settlements and forts in El Kala and Annaba and increased the cavalry in Algiers to a force of 60,000 men. The Dey also launched a campaign against French ships in the Mediterranean, threatening French ships and commerce. In August 1827, two ships were captured off the shore of Oran and their crew were taken prisoners. This period saw a few naval battles between France and Algiers as the former attempted to enforce the blockade. On 4 October 1827, as eleven Algerine ships attempted to elude the blockade, the naval battle that ensued resulted in two Algerine ships being heavily damaged, twenty sailors killed, and fourteen critically injured. Another unsuccessful Algerine attempt in March 1828 involved sixteen ships. By the end, the blockade had cost France 20 million franc without any viable results.

Domestically, France failed to bring about the conditions it had been expecting to inflict. While the regency's maritime revenues did fall sharply, it turned inland, importing goods from the south through Tunisia and Morocco, allowing the countryside to generally meet their needs. European goods still entered through Oran and Annaba, which received British ships from Gibraltar and Italian vessels from Livorno. While the blockade exacerbated discontent in Algiers, it did not lead to insurrection or a desperate situation that would lead to surrender.

=== Reactions ===
France's failure to impose the blockade attracted mockery and ridicule from international actors. American consul in Algiers William Shaler called the blockade a "preposterous policy," while another American consul, recalling the Napoleonic Wars, sardonically remarked "The French understand well being blockaded, but not to blockade." The British consul in Algiers noted that the French state "appears to have been the only sufferer by the war." The Papal States, Tuscany, and several Italian city-states, which initially expressed high hopes during the beginning of the blockade, were greatly disappointed "upon learning that the Algerian corsairs continued to infest the Mediterranean."

Domestically, popular opinion called for harsher measures against Algiers. Various French opposition figures in parliament made speeches in July 1828 criticizing the costly blockade and calling for a land invasion of Algiers. The French government received pressure to invade Algiers from both the royalists as represented by Louis-Auguste-Victor, who sought victory for the army, and traders, who were aggrieved at the stagnation of trade caused by the blockade of Algiers and the Greek War of Independence.

== Prelude to French invasion ==
Not yet ready to invade Algiers, France proposed to Muhammad Ali of Egypt in November 1829 that he conquer the regencies of Tripolitania and Tunis, while allowing the French to conquer Algeria. Muhammad Ali outright rejected the proposal, refusing to align himself with French colonial expansion in the Muslim world.

Minister of war Aimé Marie Gaspard, disillusioned with the blockade, created a detailed report proposing a land invasion of Algiers, criticizing the French navy as "powerless" in relation to Algiers, he insisted that only a land invasion could bring about a "glorious" end to the war. He also dismissed negotiations and diplomacy with Algiers, remarking "there is no security with the government of Algiers, except in its destruction."

On 2 March 1830, Charles X announced his decision to invade Algiers in the opening session of the Chamber of Deputies. He then established an expeditionary force of 38,000 men and 4,000 horses commanded by Louis-Auguste-Victor and a naval force of 103 warships carrying nearly 3,000 cannons, as well as 665 merchant vessels, commanded by Guy-Victor Duperré. On 15 May 1830, two ships from the squadron sent out as scouts were dispersed by a violent storm. The two ships were wrecked and stranded off the shore of Dellys. The two crews had walked along the road to Algiers, but were taken captive and imprisoned by a large group of armed Bedouins. After the French crew injured a woman in an imprudent escape attempt, the Bedouins killed many of the prisoners. The imprisonment of 80 crew members in Algiers served as an impetus for the French invasion.

On 14 June 1830, the French invasion of Algiers began, resulting in the abdication of the Dey, the collapse of the regency, and the annexation of Algiers on 5 July. This marked the French conquest of Algeria.

== See also ==
- Algerian popular resistance against French invasion
- Pacification of Algeria
- Franco-Algerian war (1681–1688)
- French blockade of the Río de la Plata
