= Bakri-Busnach affair =

19th-century political controversy

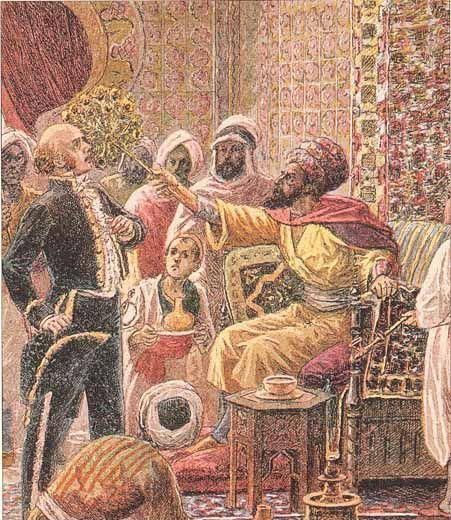
Hussein Dey, sovereign of Algiers: the incident of the fly-whisk, April 30, 1827

The Bakri-Busnach affair (French: L'affaire Bakri-Busnach) is the name of a commercial–political conflict between France and Algeria in the early 19th century; it centered on France's obligations to a commercial company owned by the Algerian Jewish families of Bakri and Busnach (Bekri and Bouchnaq). The affair is considered one of the causes of the French invasion of Algeria in 1830.

== Background ==
During the 17th century, Jewish immigrants from Livorno, Italy, arrived in northern Algeria. These immigrants, who were the descendants of deportees from Spain, settled in North Africa as traders, in search of economic opportunities. Soon they became a significant factor in the international trade of Algerian cities. They provided important financial and commercial services to the Dey (the local ruler of the Ottoman Empire), and some of them were appointed over the years to serve as the "early" mediator between the Algerian Jewish community and the government. Two of the senior families from Livorno in Algeria were the Bakri family and the Busnach family. The two joined forces in the late 18th century and established an economic company that was dominant in the export of goods from Algeria to Europe, and in particular in the export of food (mainly wheat) from Algeria to France, among other things to meet the needs of revolutionary France and other trade goods predominantly foodstuffs for the needs of the Napoleonic army.

During the 1780s and 90s, due to the growing needs of France during its conquests, France accumulated huge debts of millions of francs to the Bakri-Busnach company. The company financed its operations by borrowing from Algeria's Dey, so that France's debts to the Bakri-Busnach household were in fact debts to the Algerian ruler, and the affair became an ongoing economic conflict between the two countries, unfolding throughout the first three decades of the 19th century. France and Algeria sometimes reached debt arrangements between them, but France often violated them. In 1800, agents of the Bakri-Busnach company, Jacob Cohen Bakri and Shimon Aboucaya, were arrested in Paris, after urging France to pay its debts. After political contacts, the French government released them that year and agreed to pay 3.7 million francs out of the eight million it owed. In the peace treaty between France and Algeria in 1801, France recognized the existence of the balance of its debts to the Bakri-Busnach company, but even after that, it did not transfer the funds. One of the arguments made by the French government in an attempt to evade payment was that the Bakri-Busnach company also trades with Britain, France's sworn enemy, and therefore France is not interested in paying its debt.

The question of France's debts to the Bakri-Busnach company remained unresolved during the years 1800–1826, despite Algeria's attempts to obtain the funds at the time of Louis XVI. In 1826 the Algerian ruler Hussein Dey sent a letter to the French foreign minister, and it was decided to set up a committee to determine the debt settlement. By that year the debt had swelled to fourteen million French francs, including an interest rate of four million francs, but the new debt arrangement stipulated that the French government would pay only seven million francs. The Bakri-Busnach trading house accepted the agreement and so did Hussein Dey, who hoped to get his share of the funds. However, France did not fulfill this debt arrangement.

== The fly-whisk incident ==
On 30 April 1827, foreign consuls and diplomatic agents gathered in Algeria for a conference with Algerian ruler Hussein Dey. On this occasion, Hussein Dey publicly asked the French consul whether France intended to meet the debt settlement and whether it had begun transferring the funds. When he heard that no progress had yet been made on the issue, he was filled with anger and struck the French consul in the face with the handle of a fly-whisk and ordered him out of his audience. According to another version, Hussein Dey simply wanted to hit a disturbing fly and accidentally hit the French consul.

News of the incident spread fast becoming an outrage in France where the coup d’éventail ('blow with the fly whisk') promoted calls to restore French honour. The French government treated the incident as a public insult and demanded a number of humiliating conditions such as the highest officers of the Regency to board a French ship to apologise, the flying of the French flag from the citadel of Algiers and that it be honoured with a 100 gun salute.

Rejection saw war declared by both sides, with the French navy launching a blockade on the port of Algiers, which lasted 3 years. This action harmed the French economy, which conducted extensive trade relations with Algeria, no less than it harmed Algeria itself, so the French tried to resort to international mediation and coalition building.

They approached, among others, the Ottoman Sultan Mahmud II and Muhammad Ali, the ruler of Egypt, with the aim of mediating between it and Algeria, but this did not bear fruit. France also approached Russia and Egypt proposing a grand north African campaign to bring Tripoli, Tunis, and Algiers all under French or Egyptian control. This effort likewise ended in failure.

In 1830, France invaded Algiers and successfully conquered Algiers and other major ports. Slowly, French control expanded leading to an occupation that lasted until the 1960s. The French invasion of Algeria stemmed from many considerations, most notably internal considerations of the French statesmen, but the Bakri-Busnach affair was one of the most important immediate factors and even served as an unofficial case for the invasion.
