= Pierre Deval (diplomat) =

19th century French diplomat in Algiers

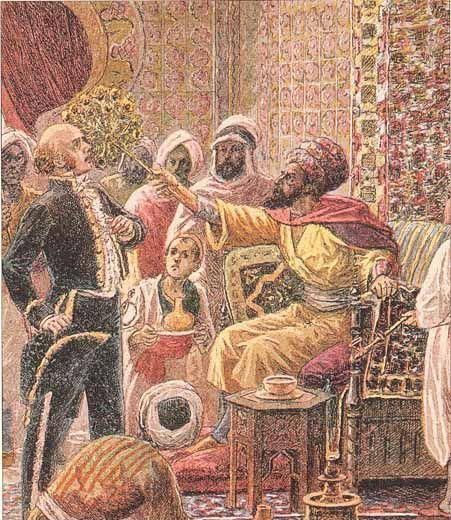
The "Fan Affair" which was the pretext for the invasion.

Pierre Deval (1758–1829) was French Consul-General in Algeria from 1814 to 1827. He is known for his diplomatic mission to the Regency of Algiers, and the diplomatic slights he received while there, which gave a pretext to the French invasion of Algiers in 1830.

Deval was a member of a family which provided dragomans to the French diplomatic services to the Ottoman Empire since 1716.

During the Napoleonic Wars, the Regency of Algiers had greatly benefited from trade in the Mediterranean, and of the massive imports of food by France, largely bought on credit by France.

Deval visited the Dey of Algiers 29 April 1827. Hussein Dey, Algeria's Ottoman ruler, demanded that the French pay a 28-year-old debt, contracted in 1799 by purchasing supplies to feed the soldiers of the Napoleonic Campaign in Egypt. In the "Bacri-Busnach affair" in 1797 two Jewish traders of Algiers, Bacri and Busnach, had sold for 14 millions of wheat to the French Republic, which were never paid back. Hussein Dey, whose predecessors had financed the deal and was now the creditor, had written to Louis XVIII, but in vain.

Deval refused to give answers satisfactory to the dey, and after Deval insulted him, Hussein Dey waved his fan (fly whisk) at the consul, becoming known as the Fly-Whisk Incident. Charles X used this as an excuse to break diplomatic relations and plan an invasion. The regency of Algiers would end with the French invasion of Algiers in 1830, and French rule would last for the next 132 years.
