= Michel Jacques François Achard =

French politician and officer (1778–1865)

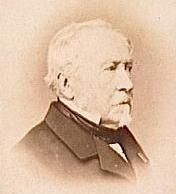
Michel Jacques François Achard

Michel Jacques François Achard (French pronunciation: [miʃɛl ʒak fʁɑ̃swa aʃaʁ]; 14 October 1778 – 6 January 1865) was a French general de brigade (brigadier general).

He was born in Vieux Fort, Saint Lucia. He was a member of the Chamber of Peers under the July Monarchy, a member of the National Legislative Assembly of the French Second Republic and a member of the Senate of the Second French Empire.

== Honours ==
- Grand Cross of the Legion of Honour
- knight of the Order of Saint Louis
- 1833: Commander of the Order of Leopold.

== Books ==
- Mullié, Charles (1852). "ACHARD (MICHEL-JACQUES-FRANÇOIS, baron)" . Biographie des célébrités militaires des armées de terre et de mer de 1789 à 1850 (in French). Paris: Poignavant et Compagnie.
- "Michel Jacques François Achard", in Adolphe Robert and Gaston Cougny, Dictionnaire des parlementaires français (1789–1891), Bourloton, Paris, 1889 Edition details Wikisource
