= Invasion of Algiers (1830) =

1830 campaign of the French conquest of Algeria

- Part of the French conquest of Algeria
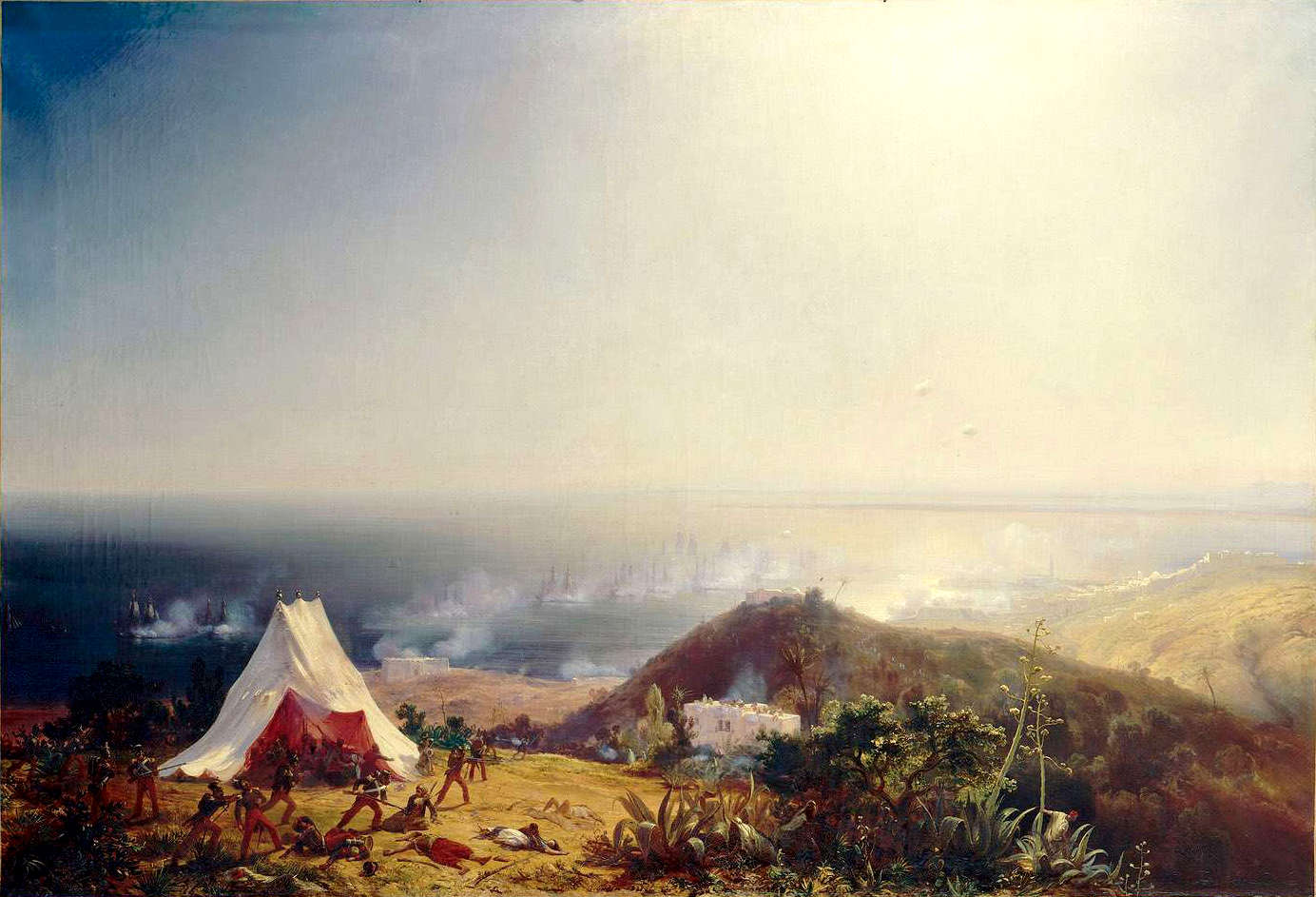
- Attack on Algiers by sea, 29 June 1830; Théodore Gudin, 1831
Date	14 June – 5 July 1830
Location	Algiers, Regency of Algiers
Result	French victory
Territorial changes	Annexation of Algiers by France and collapse of the Regency of Algiers

Belligerents
Kingdom of France	Regency of Algiers

Commanders and leaders
(Bourbon Restoration in France) Louis de Bourmont (Bourbon Restoration in France) Guy-Victor Duperré (Bourbon Restoration in France) Ducos de La Hitte (Bourbon Restoration in France) Poret de Morvan (Bourbon Restoration in France) François Achard (Bourbon Restoration in France) Amédée François	(Regency of Algiers) Hussein Dey (surrendered) (Regency of Algiers) Ibrahim Agha (surrendered) (Regency of Algiers) Mostefa Boumezrag (Regency of Algiers) Hassan Bey (Regency of Algiers) Mohamed ben Zamoum

Units involved
French Royal Army; French Navy	Odjak of Algiers; Zwawas; Beylikal contingents Makhzen tribal levy

Strength
Expeditionary army: 37,577 men: 34,188 soldiers; 3,389 non-combatant personnel; 3,988 horses Naval forces: 103 warships 464 transport ships 27,000 sailors	25,000–50,000

Casualties and losses
415 killed 2,160 wounded	over 5,000

The invasion of Algiers was a large-scale military operation by which the Kingdom of France, ruled by King Charles X, invaded and conquered the Regency of Algiers. A diplomatic incident in 1827, the so-called 'Fan Affair' ('Fly Whisk Incident'), served as a pretext to initiate a blockade against the port of Algiers. After three years of standstill and a more severe incident in which a French ship carrying an ambassador to the dey with a proposal for negotiations was fired upon, the French determined that more forceful action was required. Charles X also sought to divert attention from turbulent French domestic affairs which culminated with his deposition during the later stages of the invasion in the July Revolution.

The invasion began on 14 June 1830 with a naval bombardment by a fleet under Admiral Duperré and a landing by troops under Louis Auguste Victor de Ghaisne, comte de Bourmont. The French quickly defeated the troops of Hussein Dey, the Deylikal ruler, but native resistance was widespread. This resulted in a protracted military campaign, ultimately lasting more than 45 years, to root out popular opposition to the colonization. The so-called "pacification" was marked by resistance from figures such as Ahmed Bey, Emir Abdelkader, and Lalla Fatma N'Soumer. The invasion marked the end of the centuries-old Regency of Algiers and the beginning of the colonial period of French Algeria. In 1848, the territories conquered around Algiers were organised into three départements, defining the territories of modern Algeria.

== Background ==
Algiers was annexed by the Ottoman Empire in 1529 after the capture of Algiers in 1529 and had been under its direct rule until 1710, when Baba Ali Chaouch achieved de facto independence from the Ottomans, though the Regency was still nominally a part of the Ottoman Empire. The Regency of Algiers elected its rulers through a parliament called the Divan of Algiers. These rulers/kings were known as Deys. The state could be best described as an elective monarchy.

During the Napoleonic Wars, the Kingdom of Algiers had greatly benefited from trade in the Mediterranean, and from the massive imports of food from France, largely bought on credit. The Dey of Algiers attempted to remedy his steadily decreasing revenues by increasing taxes, which was resisted by the local peasantry, increasing instability in the country and leading to increased piracy against merchant shipping from Europe and the young United States of America. This, in turn, led to the First Barbary War and the Second Barbary War, which culminated in August 1816 when Lord Exmouth executed a naval bombardment of Algiers in response to Algerian massacres of recently freed European slaves.

The widespread unpopularity of the Bourbon Restoration among the French populace at large also made France unstable. In an attempt to distract his people from domestic affairs, King Charles X decided to engage in a colonial expedition.

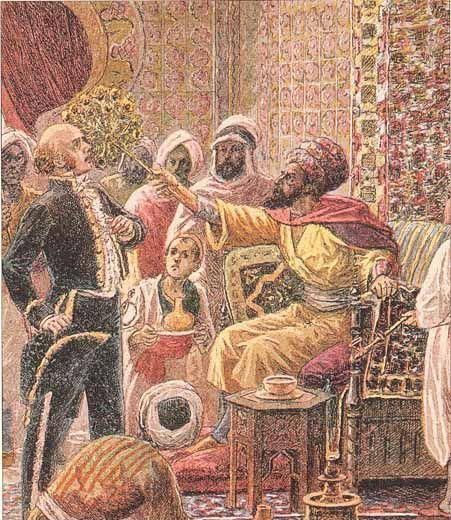
The "Fly whisk affair" which was the pretext for the invasion

In 1827, Hussein Dey, the Dey of Algiers, demanded that the French pay a 28-year-old debt contracted in 1799 by purchasing supplies to feed the soldiers of the Napoleonic Campaign in Egypt. The French consul Pierre Deval refused to give answers satisfactory to the dey, and in an outburst of anger, Hussein Dey touched the consul with his fly-whisk. Charles X used this as an excuse to initiate a blockade against the port of Algiers. The French blockade of Algiers lasted for three years, and was primarily to the detriment of French merchants who were unable to do business with Algiers, while Barbary pirates were still able to evade the blockade. When France in 1829 sent an ambassador to the dey with a proposal for negotiations, he responded with cannon fire directed toward one of the blockading ships. The French then determined that more forceful action was required.

King Charles X decided to organise a punitive expedition on the coasts of Algiers to punish the "impudence" of the dey, as well as to root out Barbary corsairs who used Algiers as a safe haven. The naval part of the operation was given to Admiral Duperré, who advised against it, finding it too dangerous. He was nevertheless given command of the fleet. The land part was under the orders of Louis Auguste Victor de Ghaisne, comte de Bourmont.

On 16 May, a fleet comprising 103 warships and 464 transports departed Toulon, carrying a 37,612-man army. The ground was well-known, thanks to observations made during the First Empire, and the presque-isle of Sidi Ferruch was chosen as a landing spot, 25 kilometres (16 mi) west of Algiers. The vanguard of the fleet arrived off Algiers on 31 May, but it took until 14 June for the entire fleet to arrive.

== Order of battle ==
=== French Navy ===
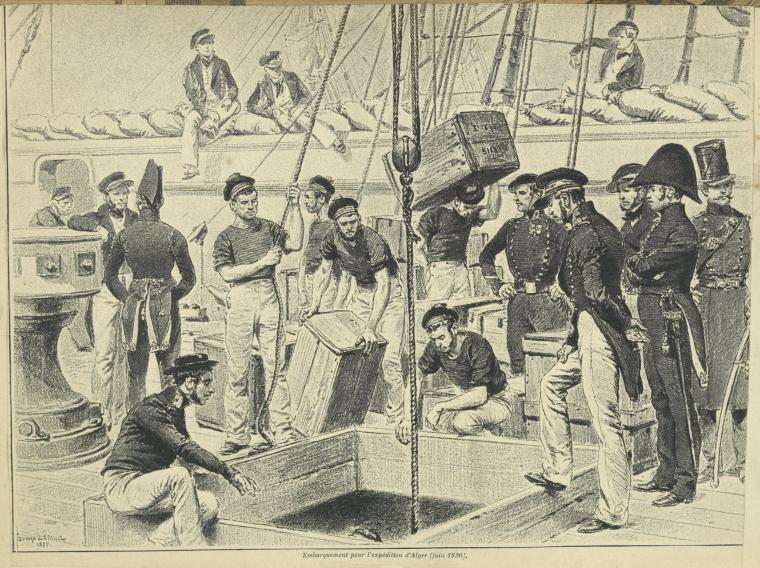
Sailors loading the ships for the expedition

- Provence (74), flagship. Admiral Duperré
- Marengo (74)
- Trident (74)
- Duquesne (80), captain Bazoche
- Algésiras (80)
- Conquérant (80)
- Breslaw (80)
- Couronne (74)
- Ville de Marseille (74), en flûte
- Pallas (60),
- Melpomène (60),
- Aréthuse (46), en flûte
- Pauline (44)
- Thétis (44)
- Proserpine (44)
- Sphinx
- Nageur

== Algerian preparations ==
Following the rise in tension and the start of the war, the Algerians mobilized themselves. The tribes of the Makhzen system were levied throughout the Beyliks of Constantine, Oran, and Titteri. The Zwawa and Iflissen warrior tribes of Kabylia were also levied, and were given under the command of Cheikh Mohammed ben Zaamoum. The Odjak of Algiers was also mobilized, and their Agha, Ibrahim was appointed as supreme commander of the Algerian forces. As Hussein Dey declared a holy Jihad against the French invaders, many volunteers from throughout the country joined the army of Hussein Dey. Furthermore several letters were sent to specific tribes whom were renown for their martial prowess throughout the country.

“Good day to all the people of Kabylia and to all their notables and their marabouts. Know that the French formed the design to land and seize the capital of Algiers. You are a people renowned for your courage and your dedication to Islam. The Ujaq calls you to holy war so that you may reap the benefits, in this world and in the next, like your ancestors who fought in the First Holy War against Charles V in 1541. Whoever wants to be happy in the next world, must devote himself entirely to Jihad when the time is right. Jihad is a duty imposed on us by religion, when the infidel is in our territory.”

From a letter sent by Ibrahim Agha to several Kabyle tribes, such as the Ait Iraten.

The exact number and composition of the Algerian army is unknown, but it is known that the majority of troops were from the Makhzen tribal levy. Estimates of the exact number of Algerian troops vary greatly, with some estimates putting it at about 25,000–30,000 while other sources putting it at 50,000 although only 7,000 of these were of the janissary core.

== Invasion ==
=== French landing ===
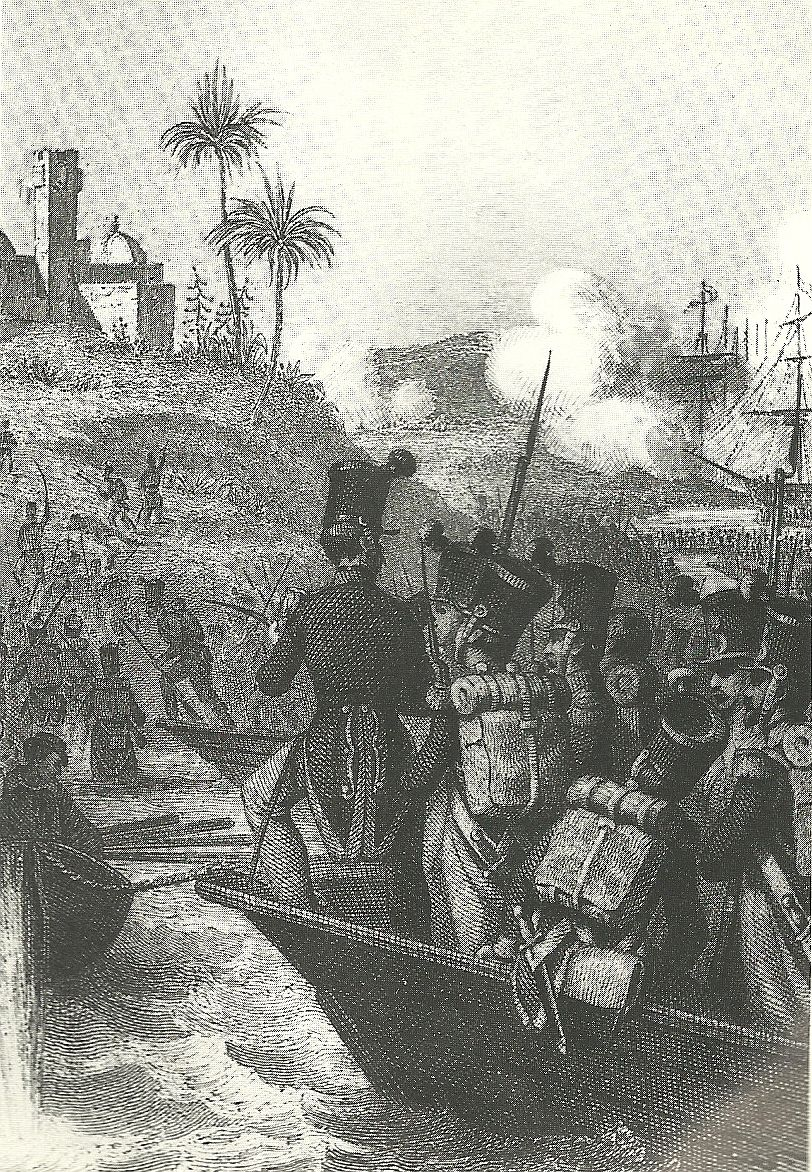
Landing on the Sidi Ferruch on 14 June 1830

On the morning of 14 June 1830, the French Expeditionary Force composed of 34,000 soldiers divided in three divisions, started disembarking on the Sidi Ferruch Presque-isle. After landing, they quickly captured the Algerian artillery batteries and the division under general Pierre Berthezène established a beachhead to protect the landing of the rest of the troops. While the French were preparing, they were constantly attacked and harassed by hidden Algerian scouts, whose guerrilla-style harassment was only a prelude to the main attack.

=== Battle of Staoueli ===
As the French were slowly disembarking their troops and equipment, Hussein Dey's three Beys, from Oran, Titteri and Medea, and various caids had answered the call to arms and started gathering forces in a large camp on the nearby plateau of Staoueli. Convinced that fear alone was keeping the French from making any move forward, the Algerian forces, led by Ibrahim Agha, came down from the plateau on the early morning of 19 June and attacked the two French divisions that had already disembarked. The Algerian assault was repulsed and the French forces followed the Algerians to their camp up the hill. French artillery fire and bayonet charges eventually turned the Algerian retreat into a general rout. By midday the French had captured the Algerian camp and many of the forces assembled by the Dey went back home. In the camp, the French found riches, weapons, food and livestock that the Algerians had abandoned there while they fled.

Despite the French success, Bourmont decided not to move any further until all the forces had been disembarked. Meanwhile, in Algiers, Hussein Dey spent the next three days actively trying to gather the forces that had scattered after the battle. Every day more and more of them arrived to the city, and soon the apparent inaction of the French gave the Algerians renewed confidence.

=== Battle of Sidi Khalef ===
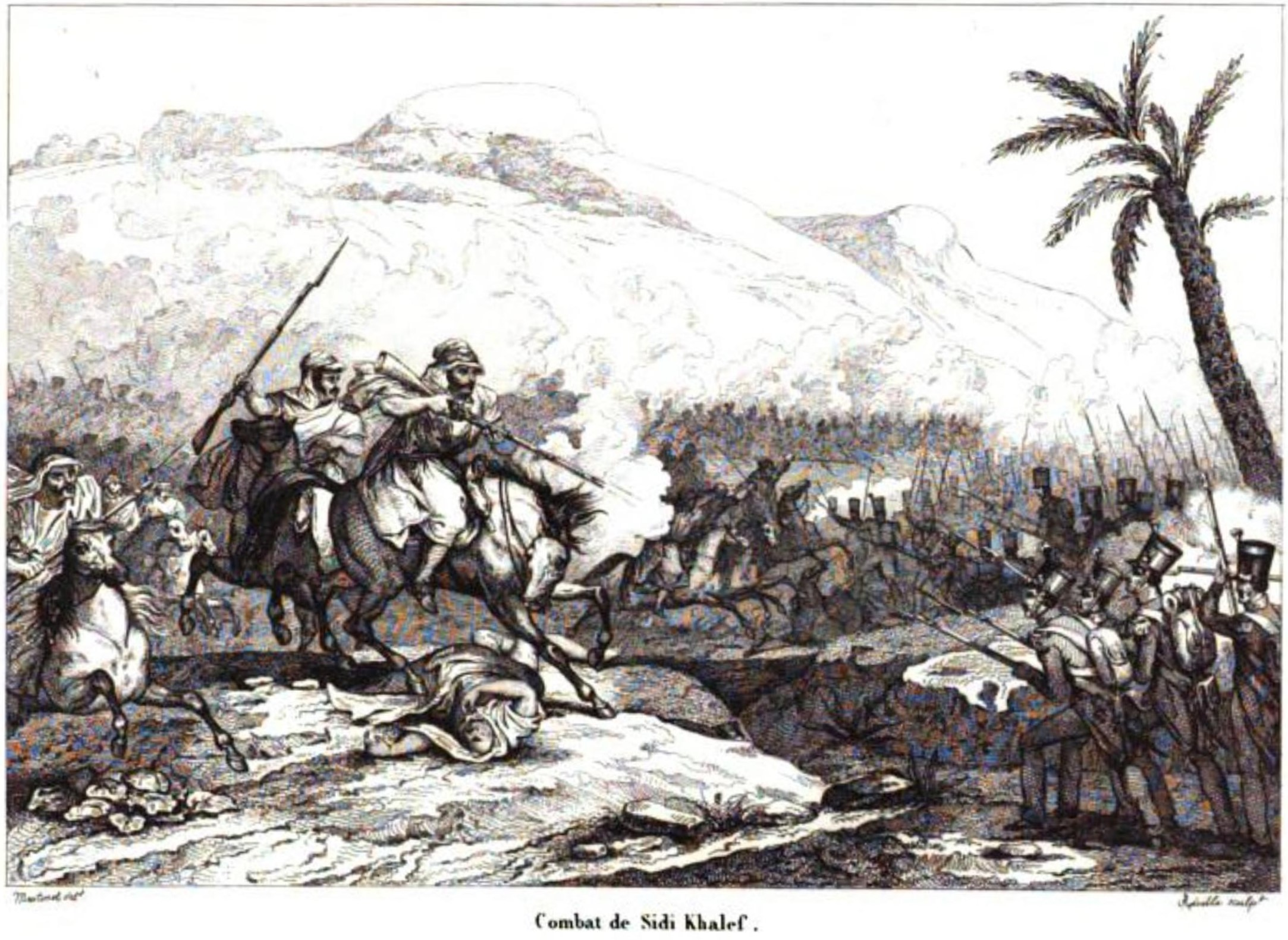
The Battle of Sidi Khalef

On the morning of 24 June, Algerian forces came back on Staoueli plateau and deployed themselves in front of French outposts. As the 1st French division started marching toward them in column formation, Algerian forces retreated toward the village of Sidi Khalef at the edge of the plateau. After some fighting, the Algerians were routed by a bayonet charge. French casualties were very low on that day, but Amédée de Bourmont, one of the French commander-in-chief's four sons, was among the dead.

=== Bombing of Algiers ===
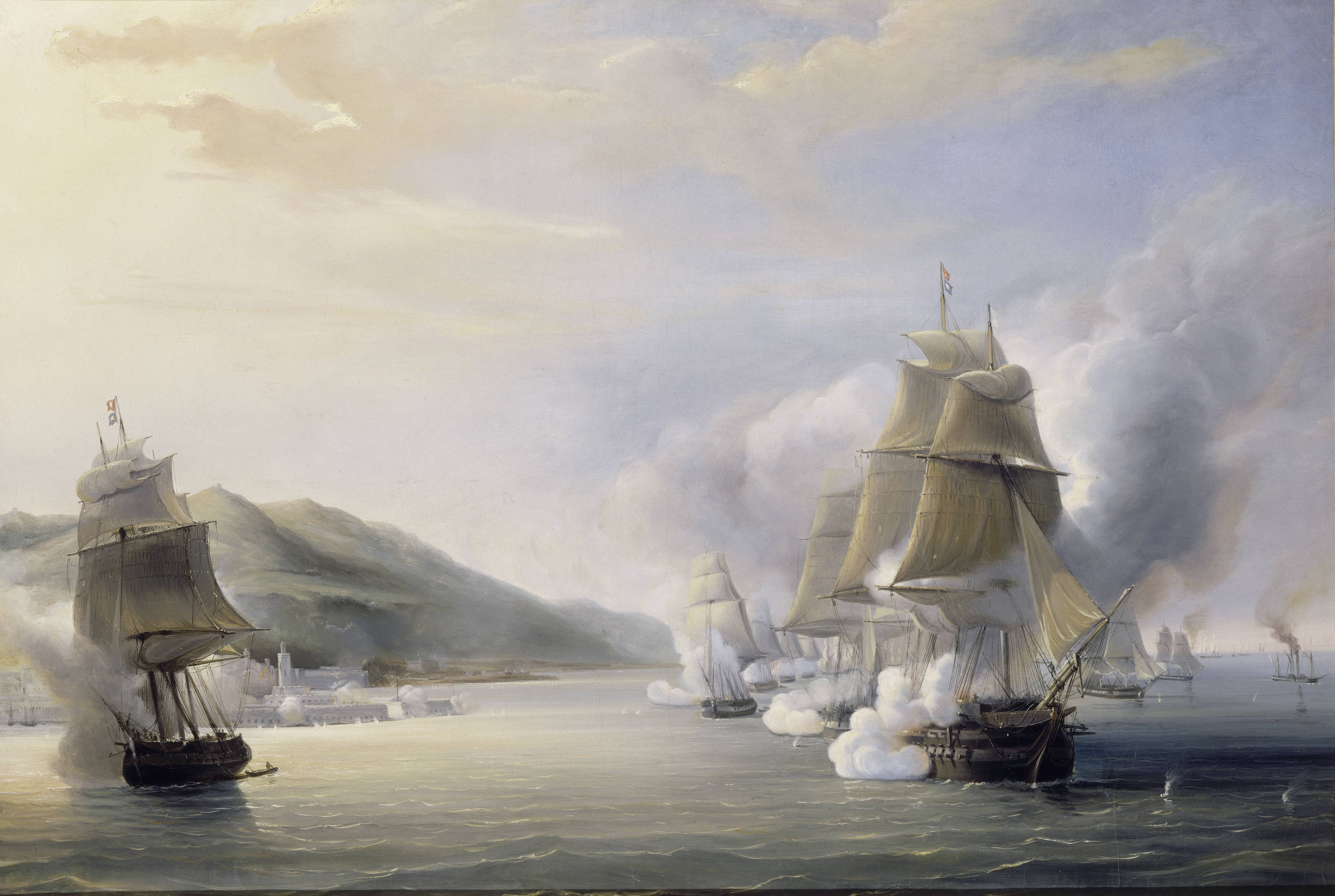
Attack by Admiral Guy-Victor Duperré

On July 3, Admiral Guy-Victor Duperré and some of his warships bombed Algiers coastal defences. However, French ships remained relatively far from the coast and thus caused only slight damage.

=== Siege of Bordj Moulay Hassan fortress ===
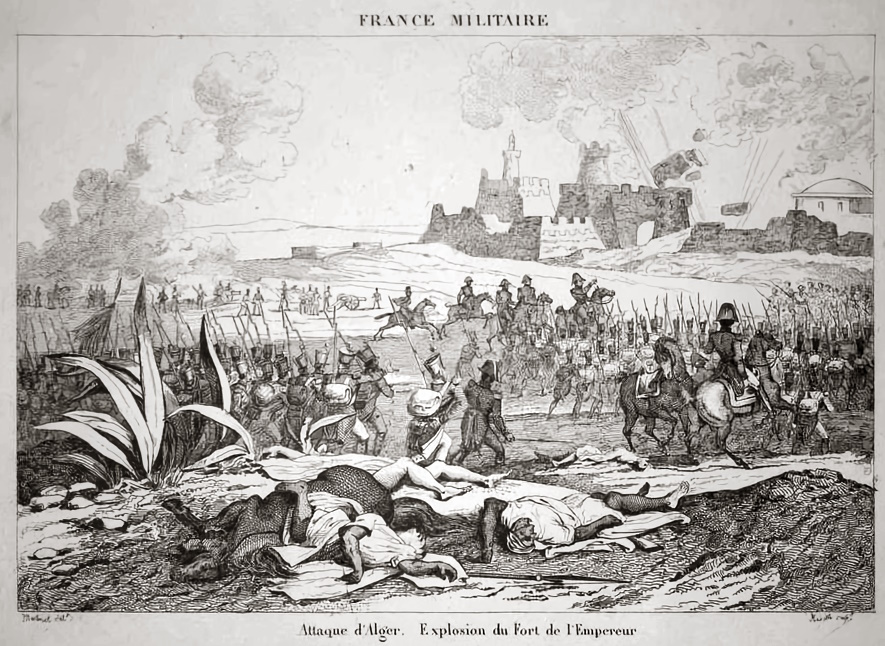
Explosion of the Moulay Hassan fortress

On 29 June, French troops arrived near the Bordj Moulay Hassan fortress, an old Ottoman fortress that the French soon nicknamed "Fort de l'Empereur" as tribute to Emperor Charles V, since it had been built in response to his attack on the city in 1541. On 30 June they started digging trenches in preparation for the siege and by July 3 they had brought all their artillery. In the early morning of July 4, general De la Hitte, commander of the French artillery, ordered all batteries to open fire. The defenders immediately returned fire, and a long Counter-battery fire ensued. The fort's garrison, composed of about 800 janissaries and 1,200 Moors, resisted for several hours despite the intense bombardment they were subjected to, a feat of courage that impressed the French. Near 10:00 am however, the defenders of the fort stopped firing as they no longer had any cover after all the merlons had been destroyed.

The fortress was devastated and most of its guns had been destroyed. The defenders then gathered what was left of powder and blew up the fortress before fleeing the place. Out of the 2,000 men of the garrison, only half survived and returned to the Casbah.

=== Capitulation of Algiers ===
With the fortress out of the picture, the city was now at the mercy of the French invasion force. The French brought their artillery in the ruins of the fortress started exchanging fire with the Casbah of Algiers.

A little after midday, an envoy of the Dey reached French lines and attempted to negotiate a French withdrawal in exchange for an official apology to the King of France and the repayment of French war expenditures by the Regency. The French refused, and a while later two delegates came to the French and negotiated an armistice until peace agreements could be reached. They also proposed to bring the head of the Dey to the French, which the French declined. De Bourmont told them that France wanted the city, its fleet, the Regency's treasury and the departure of Turks from the city and promised to spare the inhabitants houses from pillaging if these terms were accepted. Hussein Dey would also be allowed to bring his personal wealth with him in exile. The two delegates left and came back on the next day at about 11:00 am, and told the French that the Dey agreed to their terms. French troops entered the city on July 5 at 12:00.

A few days later, Hussein Dey and his family embarked on a frigate and departed for Naples.

An ancillary benefit to the invasion was the pillaging of the substantial Algiers’ treasury. One month after the city’s capture 43 million Francs worth of gold and silver were shipped to France. This amount did not include what was used by the army officially to issue pay and buy local supplies nor did it include large sums that made their way into private pockets, an activity that generated scandal back in France at the personal enrichment of senior officers involved in the invasion.

== Effects ==
With the French invasion of Algiers, a number of Algerians migrated west to Tetuan. They introduced baklava, coffee, and the warqa pastry now used in pastilla.

Many of the libraries in Algiers were burned, as were many land surveys detailing ownership of farmland. Alexis de Tocqueville likened the invasion of Algeria to an invasion of France by the Chinese:

Suppose that the Emperor of China, landing in France at the head of an armed power, should make himself master of our largest cities and of our capital. That after having burned all the public registers before suffering to read them, and having destroyed or dispersed all of the civil service without inquiring into their various attributions, he should finally seize every functionary⸺from the head of the government to the campesino guards, the peers, the deputies, and in general the whole ruling class⸺and deport them all at once to some distant country. Do you not think that this great prince, in spite of his powerful army, his fortresses and his treasures, will soon find himself extremely unprepared in administering the conquered country; that his new subjects, deprived of all those who conducted or could conduct affairs of state, will be unable to govern themselves, while he, coming from the antipodes, knows neither the religion, nor the language, nor the laws, nor the habits, nor the administrative customs of the country, and who has taken care to remove all those who could have instructed him in them, will be in no state rule them. You will therefore have no difficulty in foreseeing that if the parts of France which are materially occupied by the victor obey him, the rest of the country will soon be given over to an immense anarchy.

== Sources ==
- Blakesley, Joseph William (1859). Four months in Algeria with a visit to Carthage. MacMillan and Co.
- Pellissier de Reynaud, Edmond (1854). Annales algériennes, Volume 1. Paris: Librairie Militaire.
