= Hussein Dey =

- Dey-Pasha
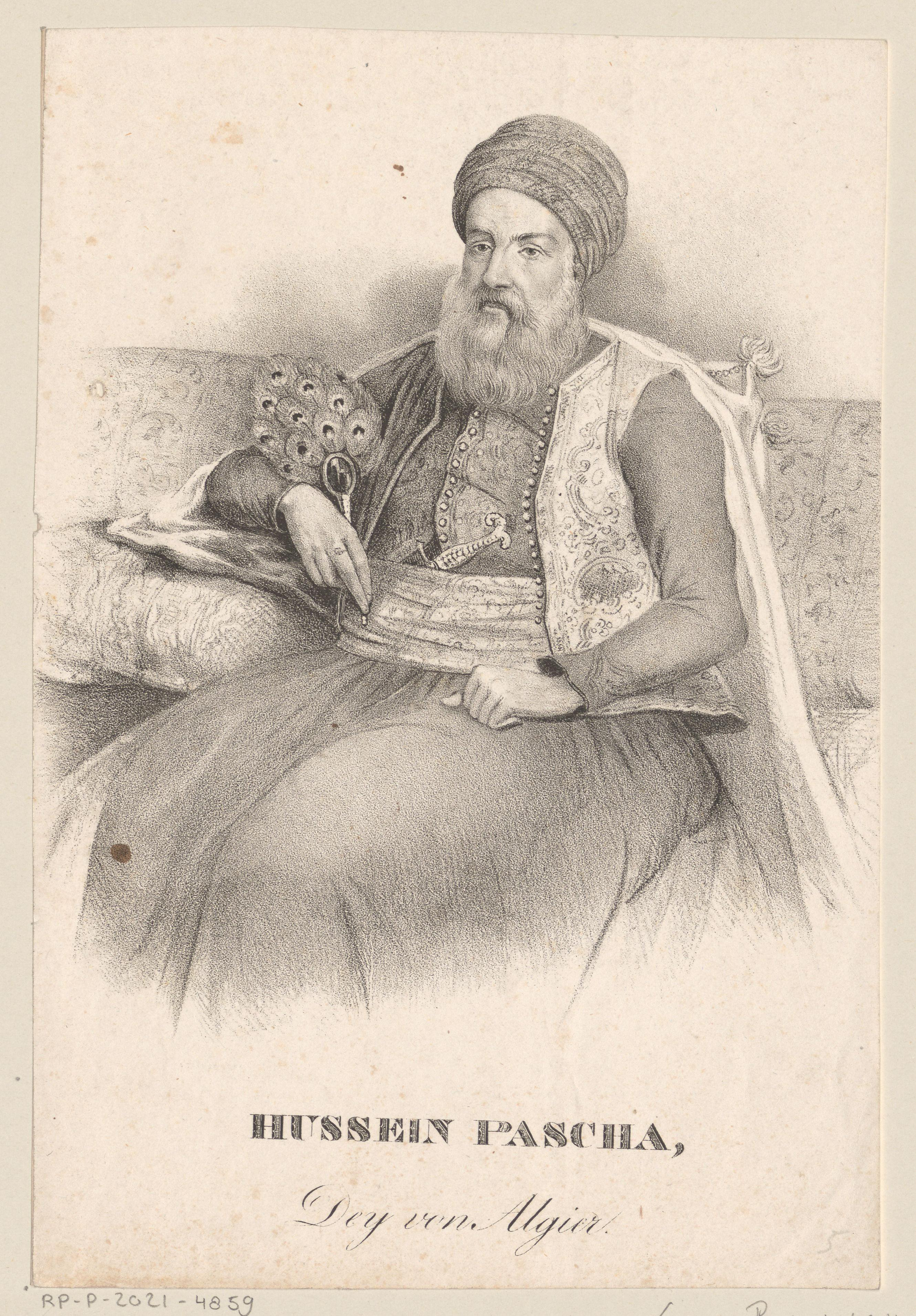
- Portrait of Hussein Dey, Royal Collection

27th Dey of Algiers
- Reign: 1 March 1818 – 5 July 1830
- Predecessor: Ali Khodja
- Successor: Title abolished
- Born: Hüseyin bin Hüseyin; 1764/65; Urla or Smyrne, Ottoman Empire
- Died: 1838; Alexandria, Egypt Eyalet, Ottoman Empire
- Spouse: Lella Fatma bent Hassan-Pacha
- Issue: Nafissa Hanem; El Hadj Omar; Amina Hanem unnamed daughter
Names
- Sultan Hussein; Hüseyin bin Hüseyin Dey-Pasha; Hussein Pasha
- Religion: Sunni Islam
- Occupation: Khodjet al-khil (minister)
- Seal

Hussein Dey also known as Hussein II (real name Hüseyin bin Hüseyin; 1765–1838; Arabic: حسين داي) was the last Dey of the Regency of Algiers who ruled from 1818 until the invasion of Algiers in 1830.

== Early life ==
Hussein Dey was born either in İzmir or Urla in the Ottoman Empire. The sources are not clear as to whether he was ethnically Turkish, descended from a local Greek Muslim family described as "Turks" in the generic, legal sense of 'Ottoman Muslim', or belonged to another Anatolian or Balkan Muslim ethnic group. He went to Istanbul and joined the Canoneers (Topçular in Turkish), and quickly rose to the rank of Odabaşı, but thanks to his character and rivalries, he was forced to flee the Ottoman Empire. He fled to the Regency of Algiers, a country which was de facto independent from the Ottoman Empire, similar to the other countries of the Barbary Coast. Algiers was well known for accepting fugitives of different countries. There, he joined the Odjak of Algiers and became a Janissary. In 1815 he was appointed Khodjet al-khil, a minister tasked with raising and commanding the cavalry of the Dey and raising taxes. He commanded the cavalry as a quick relief force during the bombardment of Algiers in 1816.

In 1818 following the death of the previous Dey, the Divan of Algiers elected Hussein as the next ruler.

== Rule ==
Husseyn Dey succeeded Ali V ben Ahmed as dey of Algiers in March 1818. He enacted some measures such as ensuring freedom of religion for the Jews. Under threat of renewed military action from the British, Husseyn Dey also freed European Christian slaves.

In 1824 Hussein Dey expelled the British consul who was petitioning the Dey to renew the 1816 treaty signed by a previous Dey Omar Agha, following the 1816 bombardment of Algiers, designed to stop the practice of enslaving European Christians and to free the existing slaves.

Following a short engagement the fleet British withdrew, though returned two weeks later, threatening to again bombard the town before the 1816 treaty was renewed.

== French conquest of Algeria ==
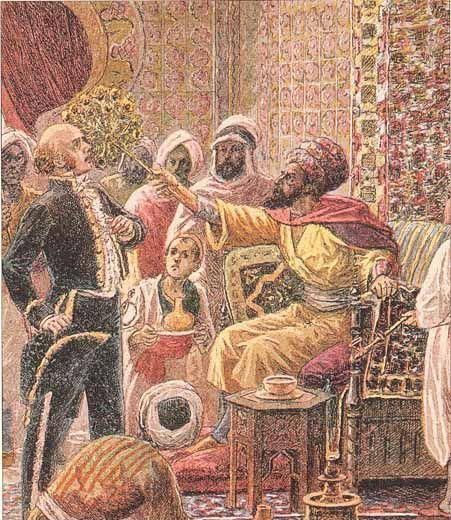
Hussein Dey insulting the French consul.

In an attempt by Charles X of France to increase his popularity amongst the French, he sought to bolster patriotic sentiment, and turn eyes away from his domestic policies, by "skirmishing against the dey". This eventually led to the French conquest of Algeria.

=== The Fly Whisk Incident ===
In the 1790s, France had contracted to purchase wheat for the French army from two Jewish merchants in Algiers, Messrs. Bakri-Busnach, and was in arrears paying them. The merchants had their own debts to the dey and claimed inability to pay those until France paid its debts to them. The dey had unsuccessfully negotiated with Pierre Deval, the French consul, to rectify this situation, and he suspected Deval of collaborating with the merchants against him, especially when the French government made no provisions to repay the merchants in 1820. Deval's nephew Alexandre, the consul in Annaba, further angered the dey by fortifying French storehouses in Annaba and El Kala against the terms of prior agreements.

After a contentious meeting in which Deval refused to provide satisfactory answers on 29 April 1827, the dey struck him with his fly whisk. Charles X used this slight against his diplomatic representative to first demand an apology from the dey, and then to initiate a blockade against the port of Algiers. When the dey responded to a demand to send an ambassador to France to resolve the incident by firing cannons toward one of the blockading ships, the French determined that more forceful action was required.

=== Invasion of Algiers (June 1830) ===
34,000 French soldiers landed at Sidi Fredj 27 kilometres (17 mi) west of Algiers on 14 June 1830 and entered Algiers on 5 July after a three-week campaign against the Dey. Hussein Dey agreed to surrender in exchange for his freedom and the offer to retain possession of his personal wealth. This marked the end of the Deylik and the start of French rule in Algeria.

== Exile ==
On 15 July 1830, five days after his surrender to the French, Husseyn Dey left Algiers with his family, his harem and his personal fortune on the French ship Jeanne d'Arc. His request for permission to live in France having been refused by Charles X, he settled in Naples. He stayed in Italy for three years and died in Alexandria in 1838.

== Legacy ==
A suburb of the city of Algiers has been named after Hussein Dey and the district that surrounds it bears the same name. The football club NA Hussein Dey is based here.
