= Sidi Fredj =

Coastal town in Algiers Province, Algeria

Sidi Fredj Lighthouse
- Location: Sidi Fredj, Algeria
- Coordinates: 36°45′54″N 2°50′54″E

Tower
- Constructed: 1970s
- Construction: concrete
- Height: 24 m (79 ft)
- Shape: square building with light atop
- Markings: White
- Power source: mains electricity
- Operator: National Maritime Signaling Office

Light
- Focal height: 42 m (138 ft)
- Range: 17 nmi (31 km; 20 mi)
- Characteristic: Fl(3) W 12s

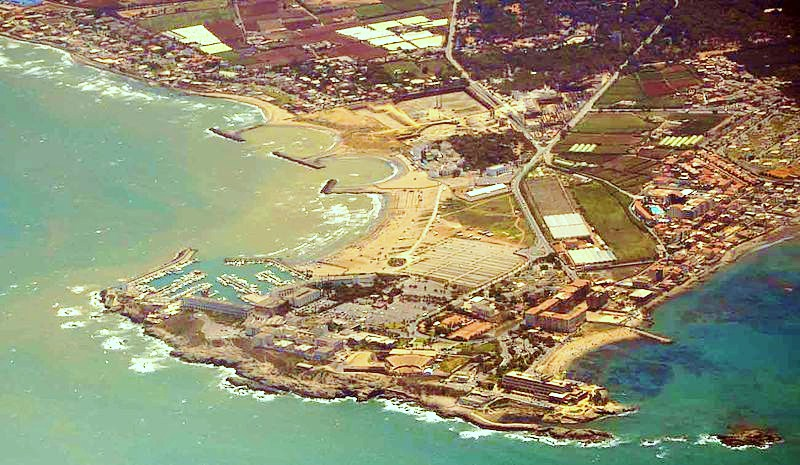
Sidi Fredj

Sidi Fredj (Arabic: سيدي فرج), known under French rule as Sidi Ferruch, is a coastal town in Algiers Province, Algeria. It is located within the territory of the municipality of Staouéli, on a presque-isle on the Mediterranean Sea.

Obori was important enough in the Roman province of Mauretania Caesariensis to become one of the many suffragans of its capital Caesarea Mauretaniae's Metropolitan Archbishopric, but faded like most sees in Roman Africa.

Sidi Fredj was the landing spot where the French established their beachhead for the Invasion of Algiers in 1830. A number of ships of the French Navy were subsequently named Sidi Ferruch, the colonial name of the town under French rule, in honour of the event.

== See also ==
- List of lighthouses in Algeria
