= Mohammedia District =

District in Mascara Province, Algeria

Coordinates: 35°31′N 0°11′W

Mohammedia District is a district located in Mascara Province, northwestern Algeria. It is located about 70 km from Oran and 420 km from Algiers. The seat of the district is the town of Mohammadia.

== Municipalities ==
The district is further divided into 6 municipalities:

- Mohammadia
- El Ghomri
- Ferraguig
- Mocta Douz
- Sedjerara
- Sidi Abdelmoumen
