= Mascara (disambiguation) =

Mascara is a cosmetic used on eyelashes.

Mascara may also refer to:

== Arts and entertainment ==
- A Máscara, a Portuguese reality singing competition TV series
- "Mascara" (CSI: Crime Scene Investigation), a 2009 television episode
- Mascara (1987 film), a Belgian-Dutch-French film of 1987
- Mascara (1995 film), a South Korean film of 1995
- "Mascara" (song), by Killing Heidi, 1999
- "Mascara", a song by Deftones from Around the Fur

== People ==
- Frank Mascara (1930–2011), American politician from Pennsylvania
- Giuseppe Mascara (born 1979), Italian football player and coach
- Ken Mascara (born 1958), American politician from Florida
- Robert Mascara (born 1972), Australian TV floor manager
- Tamara Mascara (born 1987), Austrian DJ, fashion designer, presenter, and drag queen
- Tina Mascara, American director, producer, and writer

== Other uses ==
- Mascara, Algeria, a city
  - Mascara District, the district containing the city
  - Mascara Province, the province containing the district and city
  - Mascara Airfield, an abandoned military and civilian airfield near the city
- SS Mascara, originally the Empire Cadet, a French coastal tanker 1946-51
- MASCARA, an exoplanet experiment by Leiden University
- "Mascara (The Ugly Truth)", a song by Reks from the album Rhythmatic Eternal King Supreme

== See also ==
- La Mascara (disambiguation)
- Mascaras (disambiguation), two places in France
- Mascarene Islands, an island group in the Indian Ocean
- Mascaró (disambiguation)
