= Beni-Chougrane =

Mountain in Algeria

Beni-Chougrane Range
- جبال بني شقران
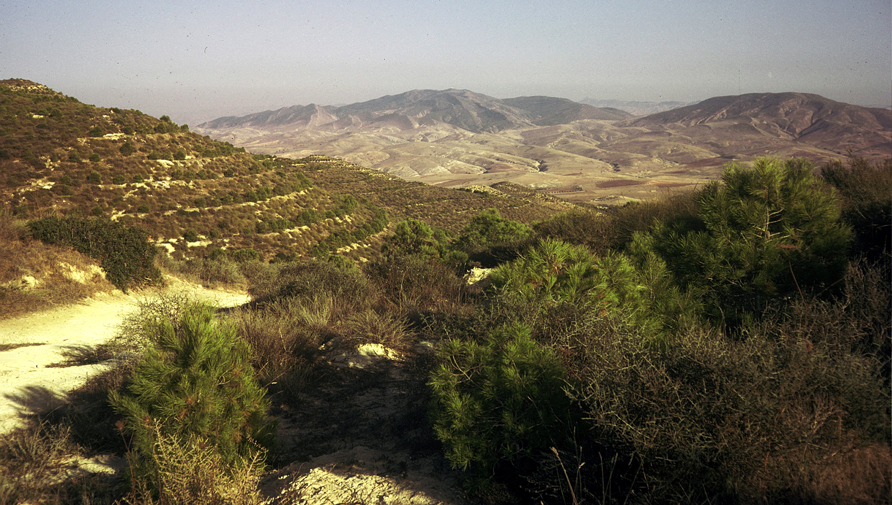
- View of the range from Sig, 1973

Highest point
- Elevation: 932 m (3,058 ft)
- Coordinates: 35°30′0″N 0°13′0″E

Dimensions
- Area: 1,618 km^{2} (625 mi^{2})

Geography
- Location within Algeria
- Location: Algeria
- Parent range: Tell Atlas

Geology
- Orogeny: Alpine orogeny
- Rock type(s): Limestone, clay

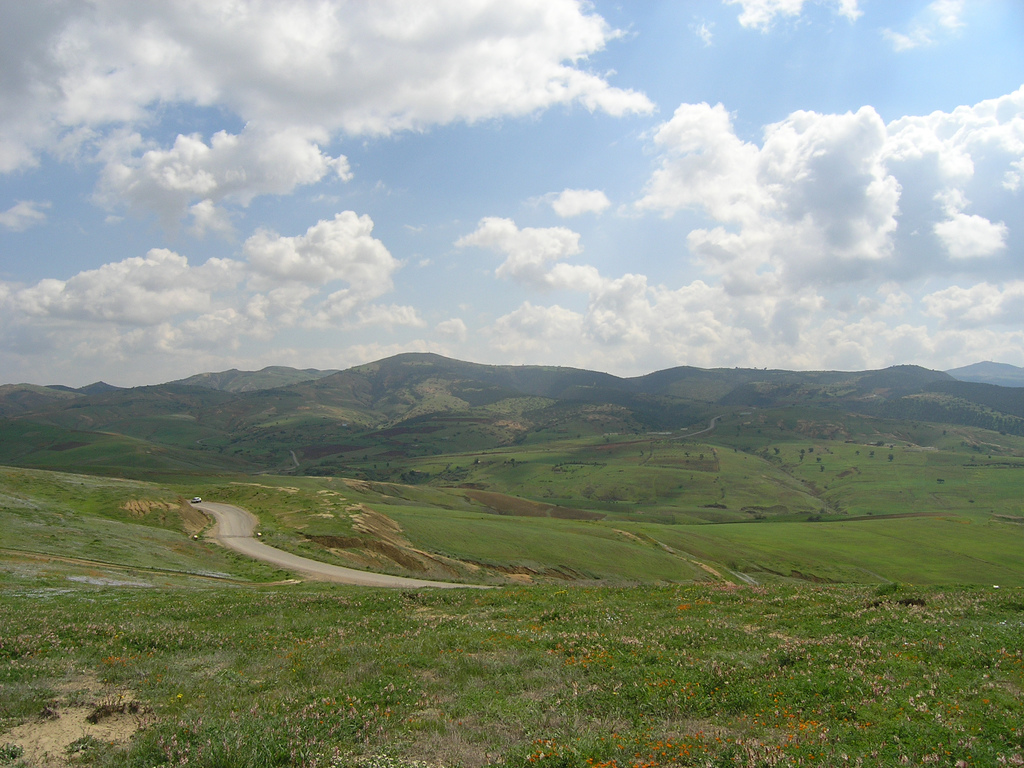
View from Mohammadia, 2007.

The Beni-Chougrane Range (Arabic: جبال بني شقران, French: Monts des Beni-Chougrane) is a mountain range in the northwest of Algeria, part of the Atlas Mountain System.

== Geography ==
The mountains of Beni-Chougrane belong to the Tell Atlas chain located between the Plain of Habra-Sig in the north and the Plain of Ghriss in the south. They are characterized by a Mediterranean climate and a semi-arid terrain, which promotes erosion. The range's average altitude is 700 m and rises to 932 m in the vicinity of El Bordj.

Several dams are located in the mountain range. as well as rich plains and major wadis such as El Hammam and Fergoug. The area is currently undergoing reforestation. The total area is 1618 km^{2} or 32% of the area of Mascara wilaya.

== See also ==
- List of mountains in Algeria
