= Ghriss District =

Coordinates: 35.2481°N 0.1614°E

- District
- Interactive map of Ghriss District
- Country: Algeria
- Province: Mascara Province
- Time zone: UTC+1 (CET)

Ghriss District is a district of Mascara Province, Algeria.

== Municipalities ==
The district is further divided into 5 municipalities:

- Ghriss
- Makdha
- Matemore
- Sidi Boussaid
- Maoussa
