= Bouhanifia District =

Coordinates: 35.3161°N 0.0483°W

- District
- Interactive map of Bouhanifia District
- Country: Algeria
- Province: Mascara Province
- Time zone: UTC+1 (CET)

Bouhanifia District is a district of Mascara Province, Algeria.

== Municipalities ==
The district is further divided into 3 municipalities:

- Bou Hanifia
- Guittena
- Hacine

== Notable people ==
- Emir Abdelkader (1808–1883)
- Emir Mustapha (1814 – 1863)
