= Aouf District =

Coordinates: 35.0979°N 0.3559°E

- District
- Interactive map of Aouf District
- Country: Algeria
- Province: Mascara Province
- Time zone: UTC+1 (CET)

Aouf District is a district of Mascara Province, Algeria.

== Municipalities ==
The district is further divided into 3 municipalities:

- Aouf
- Gharrous
- Beniane
