= Oggaz District =

Coordinates: 35.5667°N 0.2667°W

- District
- Interactive map of Oggaz District
- Country: Algeria
- Province: Mascara Province
- Time zone: UTC+1 (CET)

Oggaz District is a district of Mascara Province, Algeria.

== Municipalities ==
The district is further divided into 3 municipalities:

- Oggaz
- Alaimia
- Ras Ain Amirouche
