= El Bordj District =

Coordinates: 35.5159°N 0.3017°E

- District
- Interactive map of El Bordj District
- Country: Algeria
- Province: Mascara Province
- Time zone: UTC+1 (CET)

El Bordj District is a district of Mascara Province, Algeria.

== Municipalities ==
The district is further divided into 3 municipalities:

- El Bordj
- Khalouia
- El Menaouer
