= Hachem District =

Coordinates: 35.3667°N 0.4833°E

- District
- Interactive map of Hachem District
- Country: Algeria
- Province: Mascara Province
- Time zone: UTC+1 (CET)

Hachem District is a district of Mascara Province, Algeria.

== Municipalities ==
The district is further divided into 3 municipalities:

- Hachem
- Zelameta
- Nesmoth
