= Tizi District =

Coordinates: 35.3148°N 0.0716°E

- District
- Interactive map of Tizi District
- Country: Algeria
- Province: Mascara Province
- Time zone: UTC+1 (CET)

Tizi District is a district of Mascara Province, Algeria.

== Municipalities ==
The district is further divided into 3 municipalities:

- Tizi
- Froha
- El Keurt
