= Oued El Abtal District =

Coordinates: 35.4554°N 0.6890°E

- District
- Interactive map of Oued El Abtal District
- Country: Algeria
- Province: Mascara Province
- Time zone: UTC+1 (CET)

Oued El Abtal District is a district of Mascara Province, Algeria.

== Municipalities ==
The district is further divided into 3 municipalities:

- Oued El Abtal
- Aïn Ferah
- Sidi Abdeldjebar
