= Sidi Abdelmoumen =

Sidi Abdelmoumen may refer to,

- Sidi Abdelmoumen, Algeria
- Sidi Abdelmoumen, Morocco
