= Douar Ouled Kheira =

Douar Ouled Kheira ضووار ووليد خهييرا
- Village
- Location in Algeria
- Coordinates: 35°17′11″N 0°18′50″E
- Country: Algeria
- Province: Mascara Province
- Commune: Sidi Boussaid

Area
  - Total: 0.03 km^{2} (0.012 sq mi)
- Elevation: 784 m (2,572 ft)

Douar Ouled Kheira (Arabic: ضووار ووليد خهييرا) is a village under administration of Sidi Boussaid in Mascara Province, Algeria. Douar Ouled Kheira has 49 buildings and 8 roads according to Google Maps.
