= Aïn Fekan District =

Coordinates: 35.2249°N 0.0016°W

- District
- Interactive map of Aïn Fekan District
- Country: Algeria
- Province: Mascara Province
- Time zone: UTC+1 (CET)

Aïn Fekan District is a district of Mascara Province, Algeria.

== Municipalities ==
The district is further divided into 2 municipalities:

- Aïn Fekan
- Aïn Fras
