= Oued Taria District =

Coordinates: 35°07′N 0°05′E

- District
- Interactive map of Oued Taria District
- Country: Algeria
- Province: Mascara Province
- Time zone: UTC+1 (CET)

Oued Taria District is a district of Mascara Province, Algeria.

== Municipalities ==
The district is further divided into 2 municipalities:

- Oued Taria
- Guerdjoum
