= Mohammedia (disambiguation) =

Mohammedia is a city and prefecture of Morocco.

Mohammedia, Mohammadia, or a variant thereof, may also refer to:

== Places ==
=== Algeria ===
- Mohammedia, Algiers, a suburb of capital Algiers
- Mohammadia, Mascara, a town in Mascara Province, site of Ancient Castra Nova (Mauretania), now a Latin Catholic titular see
- Mohammedia District, Mascara Province

=== Tunisia ===
- Mohamedia, Tunisia, a town

== Sports ==
- SA Mohammadia, a football club based in Mohammadia, Mascara, Algeria
- SCC Mohammédia, a football club based in Mohammedia, Morocco

== See also ==
- Mohammedan, a follower of Islamic prophet Muhammad
