= Sig District =

Coordinates: 35.5333°N 0.1833°W

- District
- Interactive map of Sig District
- Country: Algeria
- Province: Mascara Province
- Capital: Sig
- Time zone: UTC+1 (CET)

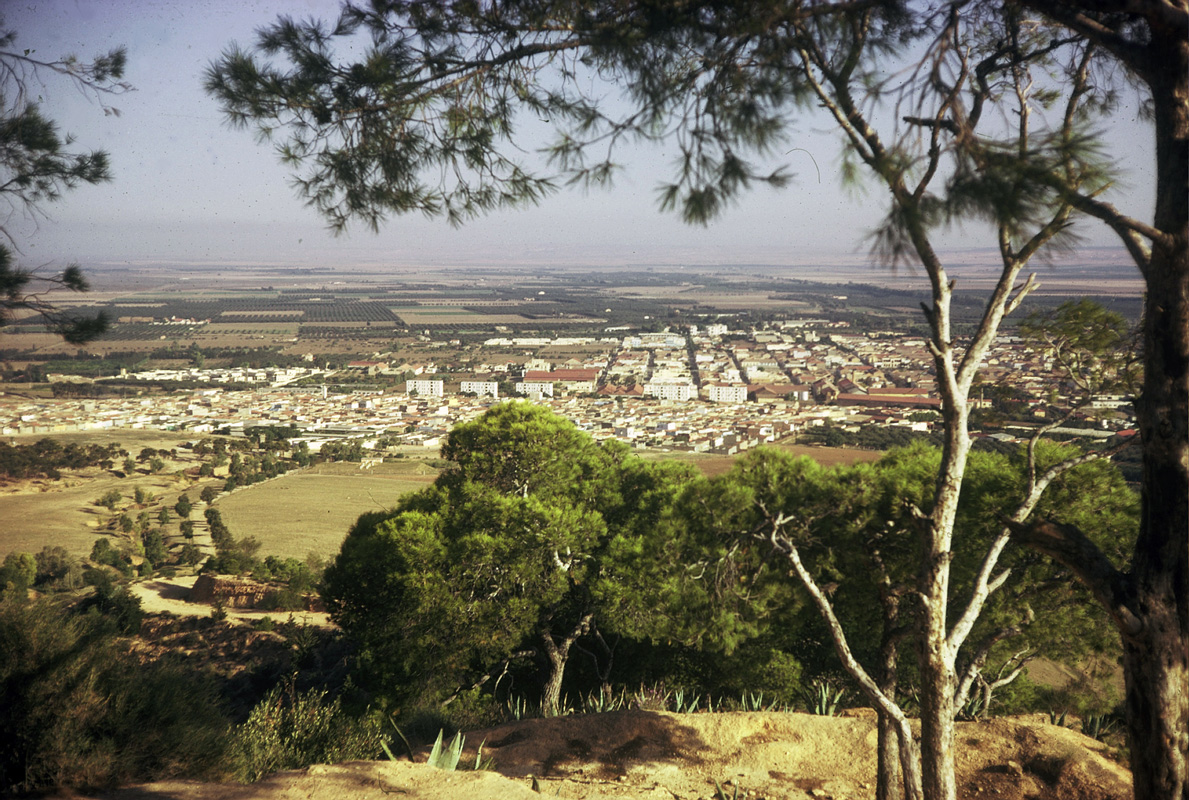
View of Sig from Djebel Bou Sella.

Sig District is a district of Mascara Province, Algeria.

== Municipalities ==
The district is further divided into 3 municipalities:

- Sig
- Chorfa
- Bou Henni
