= Aïn Farès District =

Coordinates: 35°28′48″N 0°14′42″E

- District
- Interactive map of Aïn Farès District
- Country: Algeria
- Province: Mascara Province
- Time zone: UTC+1 (CET)

Aïn Farès District is a district of Mascara Province, Algeria.

== Municipalities ==
The district is further divided into 2 municipalities:

- Aïn Fares
- Mamounia
