= Battle of El Menaouer (1957) =

- Part of Algerian War
Date	5 September 1957
Location	El Menaouer, Mascara, Algeria
Result	ALN victory: French retreat

Belligerents
(Algeria) ALN	France

Commanders and leaders
(Algeria) Si Mohamed (Algeria) Si Redouan † (Algeria) Si Abdel Latif (Algeria) Ali Hellali	Unknown

Units involved
Unknown	French Army Light Aviation

Strength
Unknown	Algerian claims: 20,000

Casualties and losses
Algerian claims: 69 men 23 wounded	Algerian claims: 650 men 6 aircraft

The Battle of El Menaouer occurred in 1957, when two battalions of Algerian rebels were ambushed by a much larger French force.

== Background ==
On August 19, 1957, two Algerian commanders, Si Redouan and Si Mohammed, led their two battalions in an attack on Mascara. Aware of the potential threat, French leaders in Tlemcen, Ain Temouchent, Sidi Bel Abbas, and Oran closely monitored their movements, fearing further attacks on neighboring cities. They frequently set up ambushes along routes connecting Mascara to major cities like Hussein Dey, aiming to thwart any potential assaults and prevent economic disruptions. These attacks had significant repercussions for French leadership in western Algeria, causing discomfort, Si Mohammed and Si Redouan, on August 20, 1957, honored the Soummam Conference by orchestrating ambushes against enemy forces. Following this, Si Mohammed's troops descended from their position on Monday, September 2, 1957, whereas Redouan arrived later on September 4. Redouan redirected his battalion to Ghirane and informed Si Mohammed to proceed to Si Abdel Latif's command center, where Si Mohammed's battalion was stationed in El Khalalfa. Despite the distance, they reached the destination. However, Redouan's battalion took an alternative route, pausing to replenish water and bread before continuing towards Si Abdel Latif's command center on Thursday, September 5, 1957.

== Battle ==
On the night of September 5, as they prepared to depart, they found themselves surrounded by 20,000 French soldiers, accompanied by tanks and artillery, from all directions. Despite this overwhelming force, they managed to regroup, along with some civilians from Ghirane. However, before they could leave, they came under attack from T-6 helicopters, raining fire down upon them. Si Redouan's battalion split into two, with one group heading towards a nearby river and the other towards a nearby village. Meanwhile, Si Mahmoud led his group along a different route. Despite the 3km distance between the French and Algerians, the French continued their aerial bombardment, resulting in the martyrdom of many Algerians. The battle unfolded between Si Redouan and the colonial troops, bolstered by Senegalese and West African volunteers. As the intensity of the conflict escalated, it even devolved into hand-to-hand combat. The Algerians fiercely battled the Senegalese sharpshooter brigade, which was covering the mountain slope. Despite the French bombardment and their superior numbers, the Algerians held steadfast, and the resistance remained fierce. The French eventually began to lose hope, and faced with the determined Algerian resistance, they initiated multiple retreats using warplanes to withdraw to Oran. In their desperation, they resorted to using napalm bombs, which wounded Si Redouan and led to the loss of one of his limbs after he managed to shoot down a Sikorsky helicopter. Unfortunately, this action also revealed his position to the enemy, highlighting the high cost of their resistance. 650 men died on the French side, with 69 Deaths and 23 Wounded on the Algerian side mostly cause of the Napalm bombs unleashed by France. France lost six aircraft.

== Aftermath ==
This battle was even nicknamed as the ’Second Battle of Dian Bian Phu’ referencing the disastrous French campaign in Vietnam.

Si Redouan was escorted to Relizane where he died of his injuries.
