= Zalamea =

Zalamea may refer to:

Places:

- Zalamea la Real, town and municipality located in the province of Huelva, Spain
- Zalamea de la Serena, municipality in the province of Badajoz, Extremadura, Spain

People:

- Alberto Zalamea (1928–2011), Colombian journalist, politician and diplomat
- Jorge Zalamea (1905–1969), Colombian writer known for anti-dictatorship satirical prose works
- Fernando Zalamea (1959), Colombian mathematician, essayist, critic, philosopher and popularizer.

Entertainment:

- The Mayor of Zalamea, a Spanish play by Pedro Calderón de la Barca
- The Mayor of Zalamea (1920 film), a silent German film
- The Mayor of Zalamea (1954 film), a Spanish film
- The Mayor of Zalamea (1956 film), an East German film

== See also ==
- Salmea
- Zalam
- Zalema
- Zelameta
