= Tighenif District =

Coordinates: 35.4167°N 0.3330°E

- District
- Interactive map of Tighenif District
- Country: Algeria
- Province: Mascara Province
- Time zone: UTC+1 (CET)

Tighenif District is a district of Mascara Province, Algeria.

== Municipalities ==
The district is further divided into 3 municipalities:

- Tighennif
- Sidi Kada
- Sehailia
