= Zahana District =

Coordinates: 35.5183°N 0.4109°W

- District
- Interactive map of Zahana District
- Country: Algeria
- Province: Mascara Province
- Time zone: UTC+1 (CET)

Zahana District is a district of Mascara Province, Algeria.

The district is further divided into 2 municipalities:

- Zahana
- El-Gaada
