= Suedia gens =

Ancient Roman family

The gens Suedia was an obscure plebeian family at ancient Rome. Few members of this gens are mentioned by ancient historians, but others are known from inscriptions.

== Origin ==
The nomen Suedius belongs to a class of gentilicia formed using the suffix -idius or -edius, originally based on names ending in -idus, but later applied to other names without regard to morphology. Most of the Suedii known from epigraphy came from Umbria or Picenum, indicating that they were likely of Umbrian or Picentine origin, although the surname Sabinus and its diminutive, Sabellus, borne by two of this gens, suggests that at least some of the family claimed Sabine descent.

== Praenomina ==
The only praenomina attested among the Suedii are Lucius, Titus, and Quintus, all of which were among the most common names throughout Roman history.

== Members ==
This list includes abbreviated praenomina. For an explanation of this practice, see filiation.

- Suedia, buried at Aquae Sirenses in Mauretania Caesariensis, aged eighty-five.
- Lucius Suedius Bassus, one of the municipal duumvirs at Lucus Feroniae in Etruria in the first half of the second century. His colleague was Gaius Masurius Capito.
- Titus Suedius Clemens, a centurion primipilus, and one of the commanders of Otho's expeditionary force against Vitellius in AD 69. Suedius was more concerned with his popularity than with the discipline of the soldiers under his command, who despoiled the villages of Alpes Maritimae. He seems to have survived Otho, and was restored to favour under Vespasian, serving as a judex in Pompeii. In AD 79, Suedius was a praefectus castrorum serving in Egypt.
- Quintus Suedius Ɔ. l. Communis, a freedman who, along with Suedia Doris, probably his wife, dedicated a tomb at Firmum Picenum, dating from the first half of the first century, to their freedman, Syrus, aged eighteen.
- Suedia Doris, a freedwoman who, together with Quintus Suedius Communis, probably her husband, dedicated a tomb at Firmum Picenum, dating from the first half of the first century, for their freedman, Syrus, aged eighteen. Another inscription records an offering made by Doris to the gods.
- Suedius Isaeus, buried at Haedui in Gallia Lugdunensis, in a tomb dating to the early third century.
- Lucius Suedius Jucundus, recorded in a first-century inscription as one of the Seviri Augustales at Aquileia in Venetia and Histria.
- Lucius Suedius Liccaeus, a first-century inhabitant of Aquileia.
- Titus Suedius Primigenius, dedicated a second- or third-century sepulchre at Pisaurum in Umbria for Sextus Fullonius Justus and his son, Severus.
- Titus Suedius Proculus, listed among the donors to the temple of Jupiter at Pisaurum, dating between the reigns of Trajan and Antoninus Pius.
- Lucius Suedius Sabellus, a first-century inhabitant of Aquileia.
- Lucius Suedius Sabinus, one of the donors to the temple of Jupiter at Pisaurum during the early second century.
- Suedia Victorina, buried at Pisaurum, in a tomb dedicated by Publius Gargilius, perhaps her husband.

== See also ==
- List of Roman gentes

== Bibliography ==
- Publius Cornelius Tacitus, Historiae.
- Dictionary of Greek and Roman Biography and Mythology, William Smith, ed., Little, Brown and Company, Boston (1849).
- Theodor Mommsen et alii, Corpus Inscriptionum Latinarum (The Body of Latin Inscriptions, abbreviated CIL), Berlin-Brandenburgische Akademie der Wissenschaften (1853–present).
- René Cagnat et alii, L'Année épigraphique (The Year in Epigraphy, abbreviated AE), Presses Universitaires de France (1888–present).
- August Pauly, Georg Wissowa, et alii, Realencyclopädie der Classischen Altertumswissenschaft (Scientific Encyclopedia of the Knowledge of Classical Antiquities, abbreviated RE or PW), J. B. Metzler, Stuttgart (1894–1980).
- George Davis Chase, "The Origin of Roman Praenomina", in Harvard Studies in Classical Philology, vol. VIII, pp. 103–184 (1897).
- Paul von Rohden, Elimar Klebs, & Hermann Dessau, Prosopographia Imperii Romani (The Prosopography of the Roman Empire, abbreviated PIR), Berlin (1898).
