= Mascaras =

Mascaras may refer to the following places in France:

- Mascaras, Gers, a commune in the Gers department
- Mascaras, Hautes-Pyrénées, a commune in the Hautes-Pyrénées department

== See also ==
- Mascara (disambiguation)
