= Battle of Sig =

Coordinates: 35.4121°N 0.0802°E

- Part of French conquest of Algeria
Date	26 June 1835
Location	Sig, Algeria
Result	Algerian victory

Belligerents
Kingdom of France	Emirate of Mascara

Commanders and leaders
(France) Camille Trézel	Emir Abdelkader

Strength
2,500	8,000 cavaliers, 4,000 infantrymen

Casualties and losses
52 killed, 189 wounded (French claim)	Unknown

In the Battle of Sig (26–27 June 1835), French forces, assisted by the Douair and Smela tribes, fought the Algerian resistance led by Emir Abdelkader in the forest of Moulay-Ismaël near Sig.

On 26 June General Trézel's column, consisting of 2,500 men, arrived on the banks of the Sig, ten leagues from Oran. There, he encountered Abdelkader's army, consisting of 8,000 cavalrymen and 4,000 infantrymen. After the French vanguard folded under the impetuous charge of the Algerian cavalry, Trézel ceded the place to the Algerians and retreated some distance away to avoid total defeat.

On 27 June Trézel and his forces set off to return to Oran. The day after, they were ambushed by Abdelkader near the marshes of the Macta.

== See also ==
- Emir Abdelkader
- Emirate of Abdelkader
- French Algeria
- French conquest of Algeria
- Sig
