= Mollaşıxalı =

- Location within Azerbaijan Location within Shaki-Zagatala Economic Region
- Coordinates: 40°50′N 47°48′E
- Country: Azerbaijan
- Rayon: Qabala
- Municipality: Zalam
- Time zone: UTC+4 (AZT)
  - Summer (DST): UTC+5 (AZT)

Mollaşıxalı (also, Molla-Shikhaly and Mollashykhaly) is a village in the Qabala Rayon of Azerbaijan. The village forms part of the municipality of Zalam.
