= Aquae Sirenses =

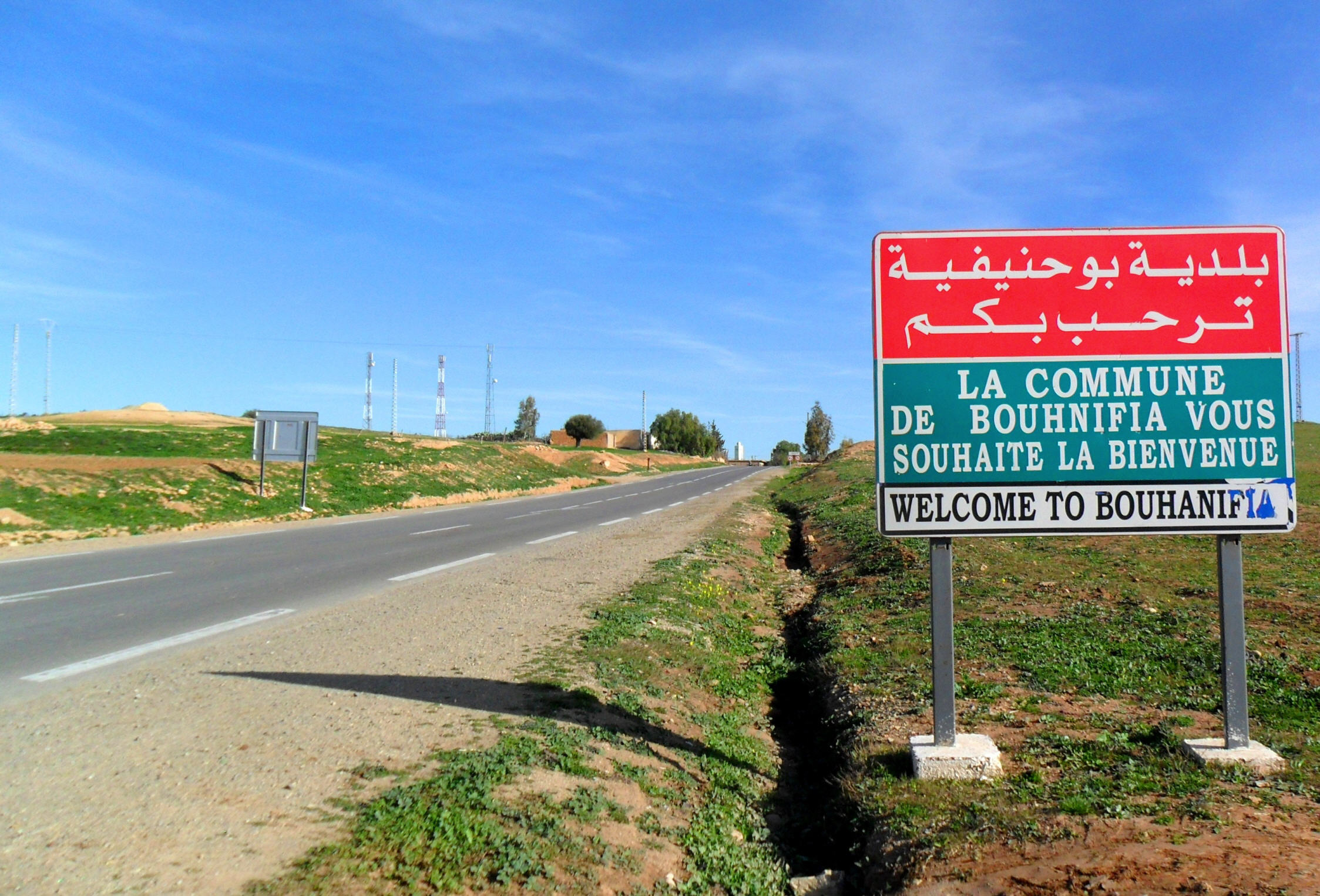
Area of Aquae Sirenses

Aquae Sirenses (Acque Sirensi), also known as Aquaesirensis, is an ancient Roman colonia and a modern titular see of the Roman Catholic Church in Algeria.

The name means Sirens Water, and was a bath town.

The ruins of this ancient city are located near the thermal baths of Hammam Bou Hani.

== Bishopric ==
=== History ===
There are two known bishops of this ancient diocese. Honoratus who represented the Donatists at the Council of Carthage (411). The grave of his sister Robba, revered as a martyr by the Donatists, was found in Ala Miliaria recently. The other Bishop, Felix was among the Catholic prelates summoned to Carthage in 484 by the Vandal king Huneric. The current bishop is Heinrich Janssen, former auxiliary bishop of Münster.

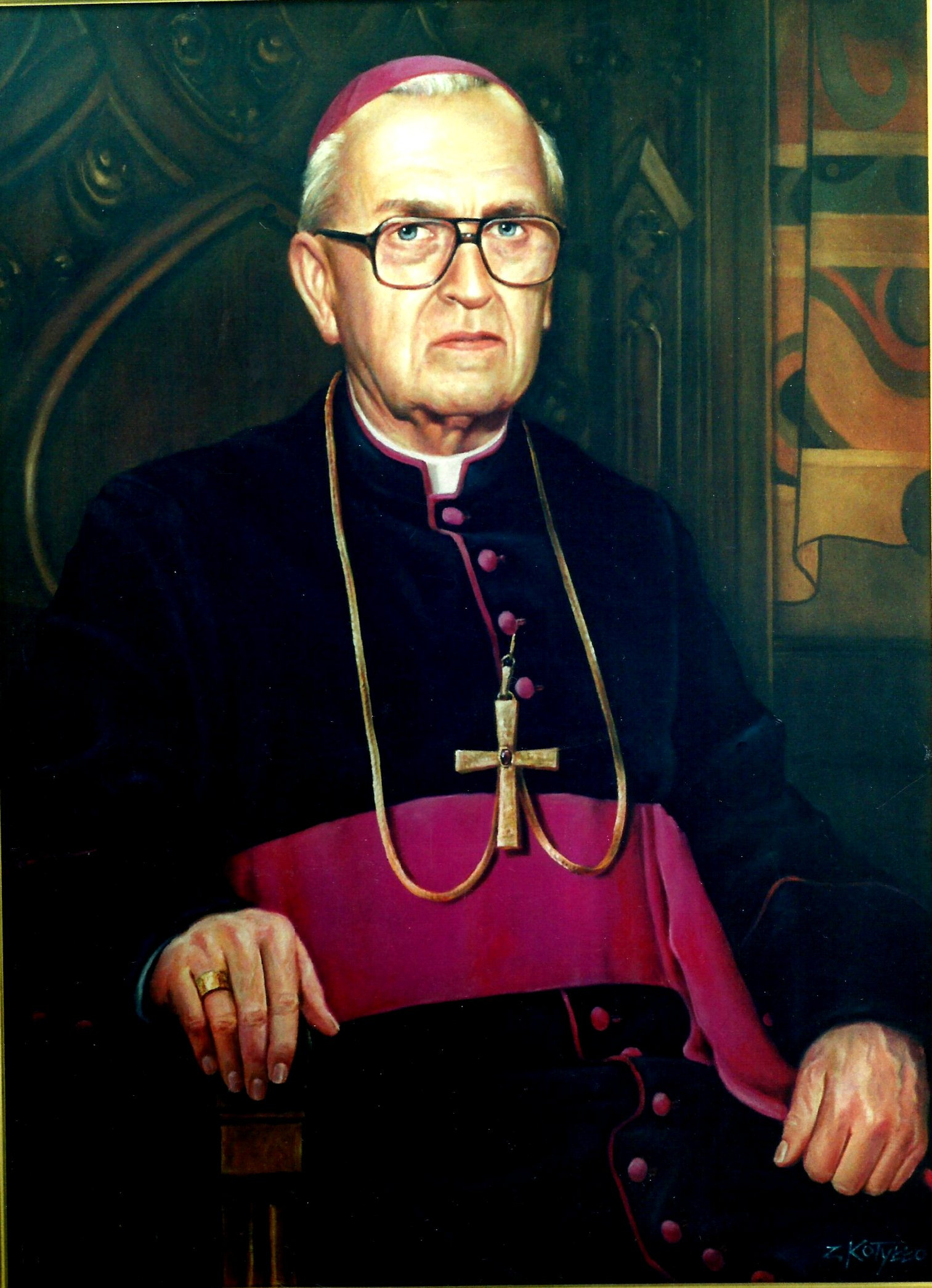
Edward Materski

=== Known bishops ===
- Honoratus (a Donatist bishop) (mentioned 411AD)
- Felix (fl.484AD)
- Paul Verschuren, (21 April 1964 – 1967)
- Edward Henryk Materski (29 October 1968 – 6 March 1981)
- Augustus Peters (6 April 1981 – 3 May 1986)
- Heinrich Janssen, 1986

== See also ==
- Catholic Church in Algeria
