= Tarselt =

Coordinates: 31°16′N 9°02′W

Douar Tarselt "تارسلت " forms part of the commune of Sidi Abdelmoumen in the Chichaoua Province of the Marrakech-Tensift-Al Haouz region of Morocco.

It has a population of around 2,000 people, with several sub-douars such as Tagadirt, Ait Brahim, Ait Elkhellad, Ait Mensour, Ibaraghen, Ait Hamou Osaid, Ait Wakha, and Ait Bamhemed.

Tarselt is known for the production of natural olive oil.
