= Mascaró =

Mascaró is a surname of Catalan origin, meaning "figurehead" or "mask". Notable people with the surname include:

- Gabriel Mascaro (born 1983), Brazilian visual artist and film director
- Gabriel Mascaró Febrer (born 1944), Spanish racing cyclist
- Joan Mascaró (1897–1987), Spanish translator
- John Mascaro, American painter and architect
- José María Mascaro (born 1947), Mexican field hockey player
- Roberto Mascaró (born 1946), Uruguayan poet and translator
- Steven Mascaro (born 1946), American politician from Utah
