= Guittena =

- Commune and town

- Location within Algeria
- Country: Algeria
- Province: Mascara Province
- Time zone: UTC+1 (CET)

Guittena is a town and commune in Mascara Province, Algeria.

== Notable people ==
- Emir Abdelkader (1808–1883)
- Emir Mustapha (1814–1863)
