= Tizi =

Coordinates: 35°19′N 0°04′E

- Commune and town
- Interactive map of Tizi
- Country: Algeria
- Province: Mascara Province

Population (1998)
  - Total: 10,915
- Time zone: UTC+1 (CET)

Tizi is a town and commune in Mascara Province, Algeria. According to the 1998 census it has a population of 10,915.
