= La Mascara =

La Mascara may refer to:

- La Mascara (wrestler), Mexican professional wrestler
- La Mascara (EP), an EP by The Blackeyed Susans
