= Aïn Fares, Mascara =

Aïn Fares
- Commune and town

- Location of Aïn Fares, Mascara within Algeria
- Coordinates: 35.4799°N 0.2449°E
- Country: Algeria
- Province: Mascara Province

Population (1998)
  - Total: 12,454
- Time zone: UTC+1 (CET)

Aïn Fares is a town and commune in Mascara Province, Algeria. According to the 1998 census it has a population of 12,454.
