= Sig, Algeria =

Sig
- Town
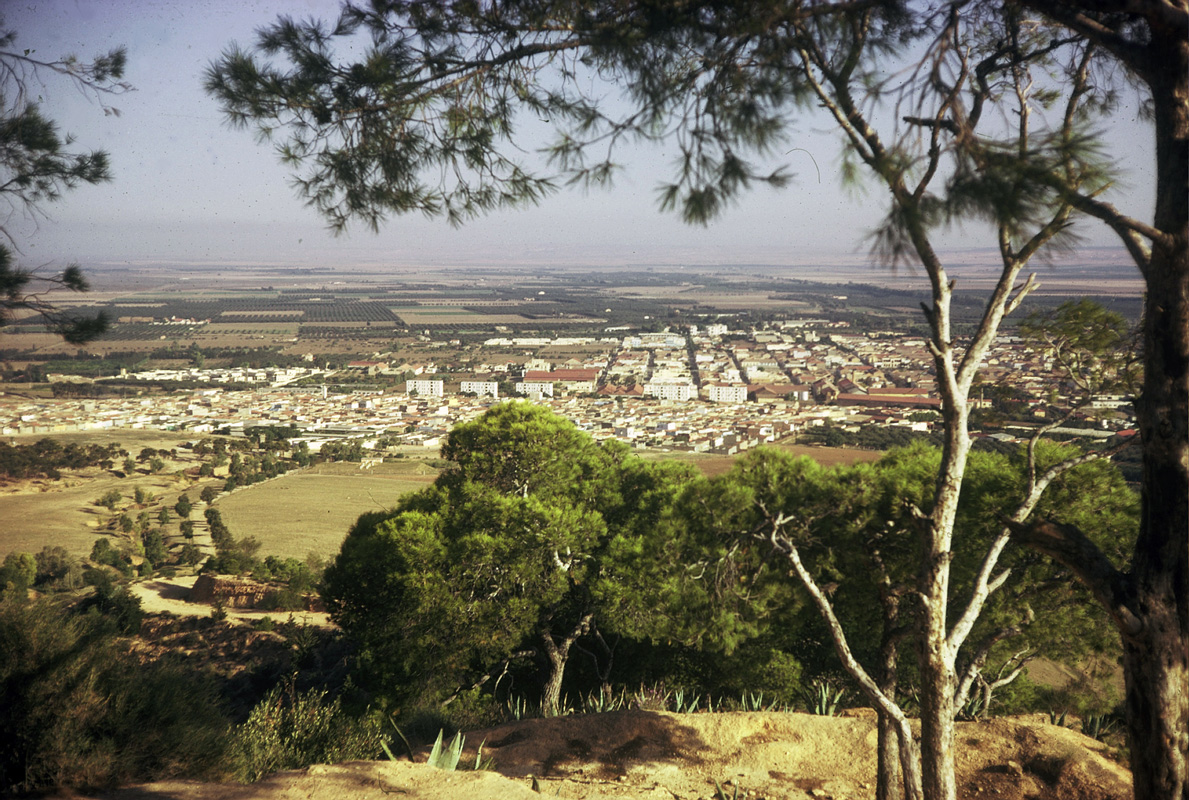

- Location within Algeria
- Coordinates: 35°31′40″N 0°11′10″W
- Country: Algeria
- Provinces: Mascara
- District: Sig

Population (Census 2008)
  - Total: 70,499

Sig (Arabic: سيق Sīq; called Saint-Denis-de-Sig under French rule; Latin: Tasacora) is a town in northwestern Algeria. Formerly located in Oran Province and now located in Mascara Province, north-western Algeria. Its population was 61,373 in 2008.

The town's public garden is on the bank of the Sig River just down stream the confluence of the le-Mebtoûh and the Matarah. Sig is surrounded by fertile land irrigated by the Barrages des Cheurfas (dams) 25 kilometres (16 mi) upstream with the overflow stored in the Petit Barrage (little dams) 3.2 kilometres (2.0 mi) upstream from the town. The local land supports the growing of olives, cotton, flax, grains, tobacco, and wine, much of which is processed locally and exported. The other local industry is mineral mining, primarily for diatomite.

Sig is located about 29 kilometres (18 mi) south the Gulf of Arzew, separated by the Sig plains and north-west of Mount Touakas (349 metres (1,145 ft) high). Sig is about 44 kilometres (27 mi) east of Oran and 450 kilometres (280 mi) from Algiers. The temperatures usually rise from May to the end of August.

== Notable people ==
- Rachid Taha (1958–2018), Algerian singer
- Paul Quilès (1942–2021), French politician

== See also ==
- Battle of Sig
