= El Keurt =

Coordinates: 35°23′N 0°05′E

- Commune and town
- Interactive map of El Keurt
- Country: Algeria
- Province: Mascara Province

Population (1998)
  - Total: 3,536
- Time zone: UTC+1 (CET)

El Keurt is a town and commune in Mascara Province, Algeria. According to the 1998 census it has a population of 3,536.
