= Chorfa, Mascara =

Coordinates: 35°25′55″N 0°14′43″W

Chorfa
- Commune and town
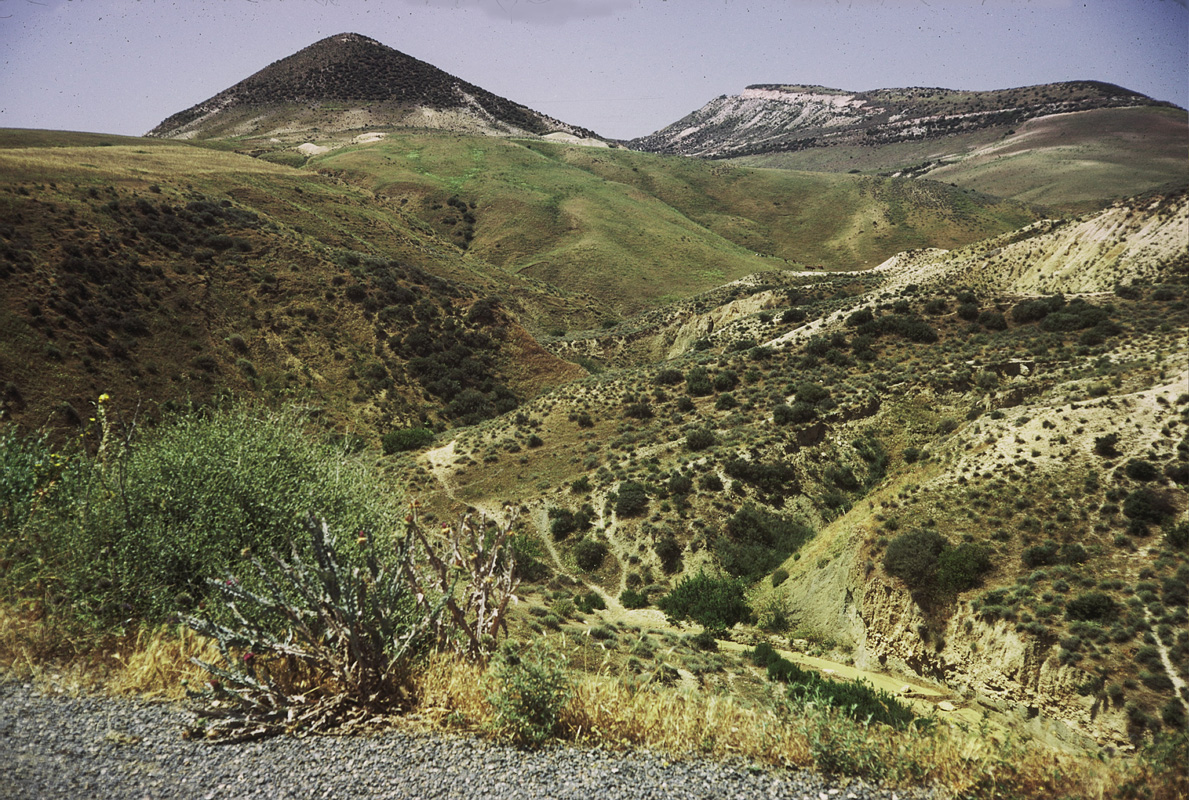

- Location of Chorfa within Mascara Province
- Country: Algeria
- Province: Mascara Province

Population (2002)
  - Total: 14,850

Chorfa is a town and commune in Mascara Province, Algeria. The population in 2002 was 14,850.
