= Ras Ain Amirouche =

Coordinates: 35°35′33″N 0°12′45″W

- Commune and town
- Interactive map of Ras Ain Amirouche
- Country: Algeria
- Province: Mascara Province

Population (1998)
  - Total: 6,183
- Time zone: UTC+1 (CET)

Ras Ain Amirouche is a town and commune in Mascara Province, Algeria. According to the 1998 census it has a population of 6,183.
