= Aïn Ferah =

Coordinates: 35°22′52″N 0°47′02″E

- Commune and town
- Interactive map of Aïn Ferah
- Country: Algeria
- Province: Mascara Province

Population (1998)
  - Total: 5,394
- Time zone: UTC+1 (CET)

Aïn Ferah is a town and commune in Mascara Province, Algeria. According to the 1998 census it has a population of 5,394.
