= John Mascaro =

American painter

John Mascaro is a painter and self-taught architect working between New York and Los Angeles.

Mascaro graduated with an MFA from the Slade School of Art in 2004. In 2008 he co-founded Mut-Architecture with Eleonore Morand after meeting at Acconci Studio in Brooklyn, NY. Mut's projects blur the division between painting and architecture, as seen most specifically in their "Restaurant 51" project at the [Cinémathèque Française] in Paris, France, and the "South Bronx Igloo project" in which a large cardboard igloo was fabricated atop a roof in the South Bronx section of New York.

Mascaro's paintings and structural experiments have been exhibited at Haven Arts in the South Bronx, New York, and Le Carré Noir in France.
