= Ferraguig =

Coordinates: 35°32′N 0°09′E

- Commune and town
- Interactive map of Ferraguig
- Country: Algeria
- Province: Mascara Province

Population (1998)
  - Total: 2,379
- Time zone: UTC+1 (CET)

Ferraguig is a town and commune in Mascara Province, Algeria. According to the 1998 census it has a population of 2,379.
