= Aouf =

Coordinates: 35°06′N 0°21′E

- Commune and town
- Interactive map of Aouf
- Country: Algeria
- Province: Mascara Province

Population (1998)
  - Total: 7,326
- Time zone: UTC+1 (CET)

Aouf is a town and commune in Mascara Province, Algeria. According to the 1998 census it has a population of 7,326.
