= Gharrous =

- Commune and town
- Location within Algeria
- Coordinates: 35°11′45″N 0°24′03″E
- Country: Algeria
- Province: Mascara Province

Population (1998)
  - Total: 3,088
- Time zone: UTC+1 (CET)

Gharrous is a town and commune in Mascara Province, Algeria. According to the 1998 census it has a population of 3,088.
