= Oggaz =

Coordinates: 35°34′N 0°16′W

- Commune and town
- Interactive map of Oggaz
- Country: Algeria
- Province: Mascara Province

Population (1998)
  - Total: 10,120
- Time zone: UTC+1 (CET)

Oggaz is a town and commune in Mascara Province, Algeria. According to the 1998 census it has a population of 10,120.
