= Hacine =

Hacine حسين Dublineau
- Commune and town
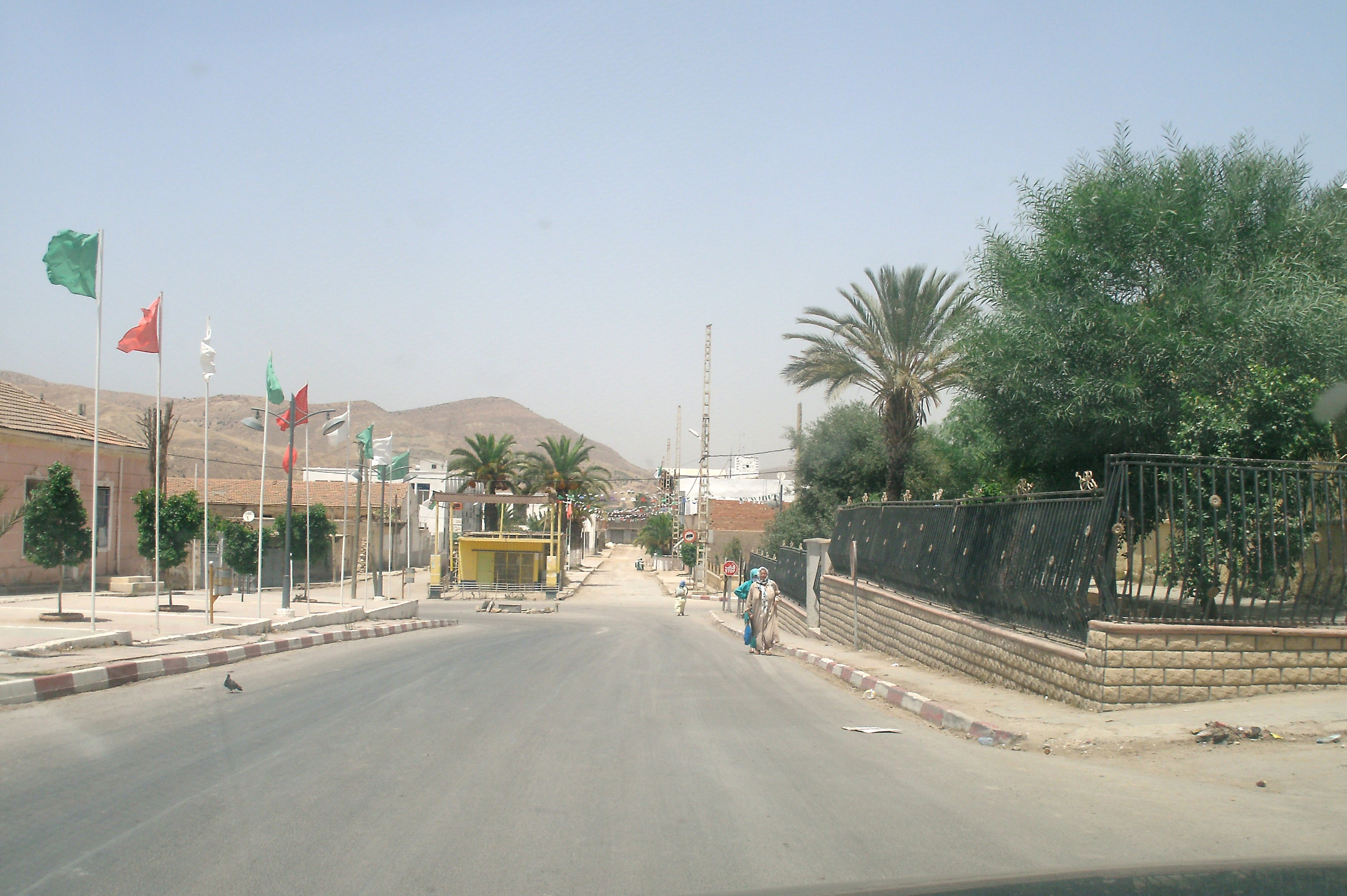
- Interactive map of Hacine
- Coordinates: 35°27′25″N 00°00′09″W
- Country: Algeria
- Province: Mascara Province

Population (1998)
  - Total: 9,176
- Time zone: UTC+1 (CET)

Hacine (Arabic: حسين, romanized: Ḥasīn; previously Dublineau, ديبلينو Dīblīnū) is a town and commune in Mascara Province, Algeria. According to the 1998 census it has a population of 9,176. In 1994, an earthquake destroyed the village, along with two others, and killed 171 people.
