= Sidi Abdeldjebar =

Coordinates: 35°26′34″N 0°31′24″E

Sidi Abdeldjebar سيدي عبد الجبار
- Commune and town
- Interactive map of Sidi Abdeldjebar
- Country: Algeria
- Province: Mascara Province

Population (2008)
  - Total: 4,190
- Time zone: UTC+1 (CET)

Sidi Abdeldjebar (Arabic: سيدي عبد الجبار) is a town and commune in Mascara Province, Algeria. According to the 2008 census, it has a population of 4,190 .
