= Aïn Fekan =

Coordinates: 35°13′30″N 0°00′06″W

- Commune and town
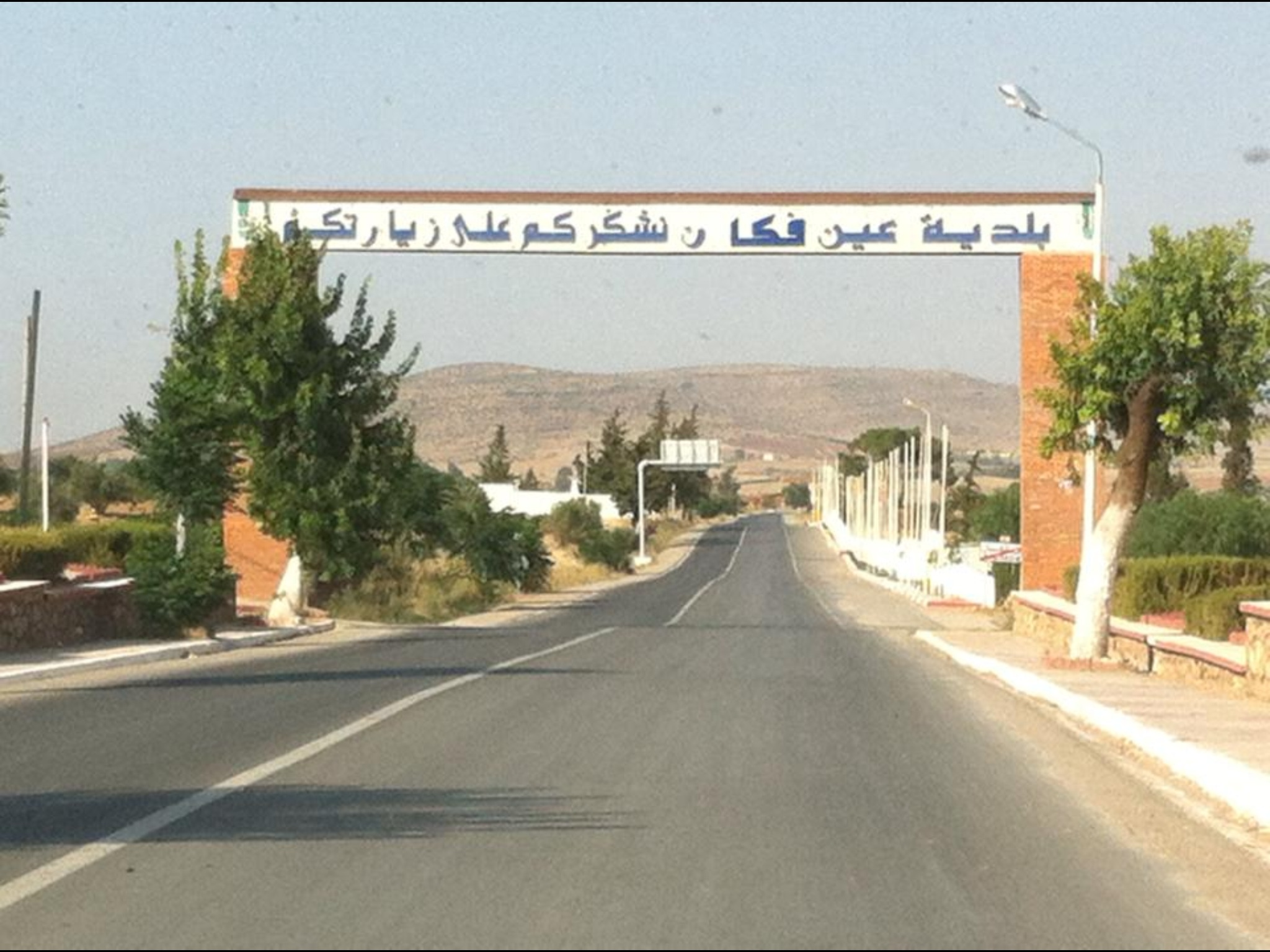
- Sign reading "The Commune of Aïn Fekan thanks you for your visit"
- Interactive map of Aïn Fekan
- Country: Algeria
- Province: Mascara Province

Population (1998)
  - Total: 10,573
- Time zone: UTC+1 (CET)

Aïn Fekan is a town and commune in Mascara Province, Algeria. According to the 1998 census it has a population of 10,573.
