= Aïn Fras =

Coordinates: 35°12′23″N 0°09′27″W

- Commune and town
- Interactive map of Aïn Fras
- Country: Algeria
- Province: Mascara Province

Population (1998)
  - Total: 1,628
- Time zone: UTC+1 (CET)

Aïn Fras is a town and commune in Mascara Province, Algeria. According to the 1998 census it has a population of 1,628.
