= Mocta Douz =

Coordinates: 35°36′N 0°03′W

- Commune and town
- Interactive map of Mocta Douz
- Country: Algeria
- Province: Mascara Province
- Time zone: UTC+1 (CET)

Mocta Douz is a town and commune in Mascara Province, Algeria. Mocta Douz is the site of the terminus of the Mocta Douz-Beni Saf gas pipeline.
