= Sidi Abdelmoumen, Morocco =

Sidi Abdelmoumen جماعة سيدي عبدالمومن
- Rural commune and town
- Interactive map of Sidi Abdelmoumen
- Country: Morocco
- Region: Marrakech-Safi
- Province: Chichaoua Province

Population (2014)
  - Total: 9,007
- Time zone: UTC+0 (GMT)

Sidi Abdelmoumen is a town and rural commune in Chichaoua Province of the Marrakech-Safi region of Morocco. At the time of the 2014 census, the commune had a total population of 9007 people living in 1908 households, it content many douars like Tarselt, Ait Smail, Tadnest.
