= Bou Henni =

Coordinates: 35°33′38″N 0°05′04″W

- Commune and town
- Interactive map of Bou Henni
- Country: Algeria
- Province: Mascara Province

Population (1998)
  - Total: 10,240
- Time zone: UTC+1 (CET)

Bou Henni is a town and commune in Mascara Province, Algeria. According to the 1998 census it has a population of 10,240.
