= Guerdjoum =

Coordinates: 35°10′N 0°04′E

- Commune and town
- Interactive map of Guerdjoum
- Country: Algeria
- Province: Mascara Province

Population (1998)
  - Total: 2,341
- Time zone: UTC+1 (CET)

Guerdjoum is a town and commune in Mascara Province, Algeria. According to the 1998 census it has a population of 2,341.
