= Maoussa =

Coordinates: 35°23′N 0°15′E

- Commune and town
- Interactive map of Maoussa
- Country: Algeria
- Province: Mascara Province

Population (1998)
  - Total: 18,104
- Time zone: UTC+1 (CET)

Maoussa (Arabic: ماوسة Mawsa) is a town and commune in Mascara Province, Algeria. According to the 1998 census it has a population of 18,104.
