= Froha =

- Commune and town

- Location of Froha in Algeria
- Coordinates: 35°18′13″N 0°7′37″E
- Country: Algeria
- Province: Mascara Province

Population (1998)
  - Total: 11,969
- Time zone: UTC+1 (CET)

Froha is a town and commune in Mascara Province, Algeria. According to the 1998 census it has a population of 11,969.
