= El Ghomri =

Coordinates: 35°41′N 0°12′E

- Commune and town
- Interactive map of El Ghomri
- Country: Algeria
- Province: Mascara Province

Population (1998)
  - Total: 8,585
- Time zone: UTC+1 (CET)

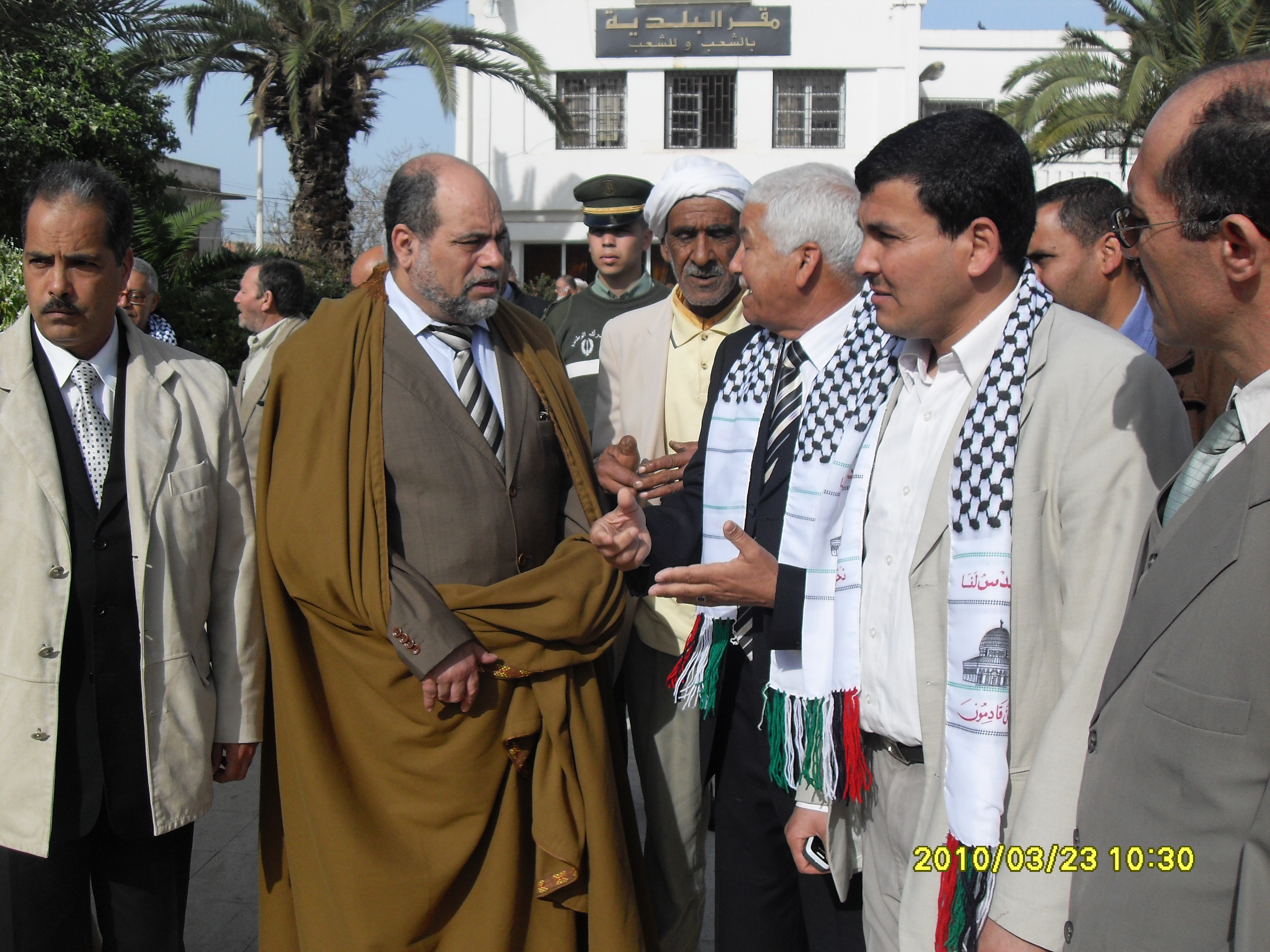

El Ghomri is a town and commune in Mascara Province, Algeria. According to the 1998 census it has a population of 8,585.
