= El-Gaada =

Coordinates: 35°25′31″N 0°18′54″W

El Gaada
- Commune and town
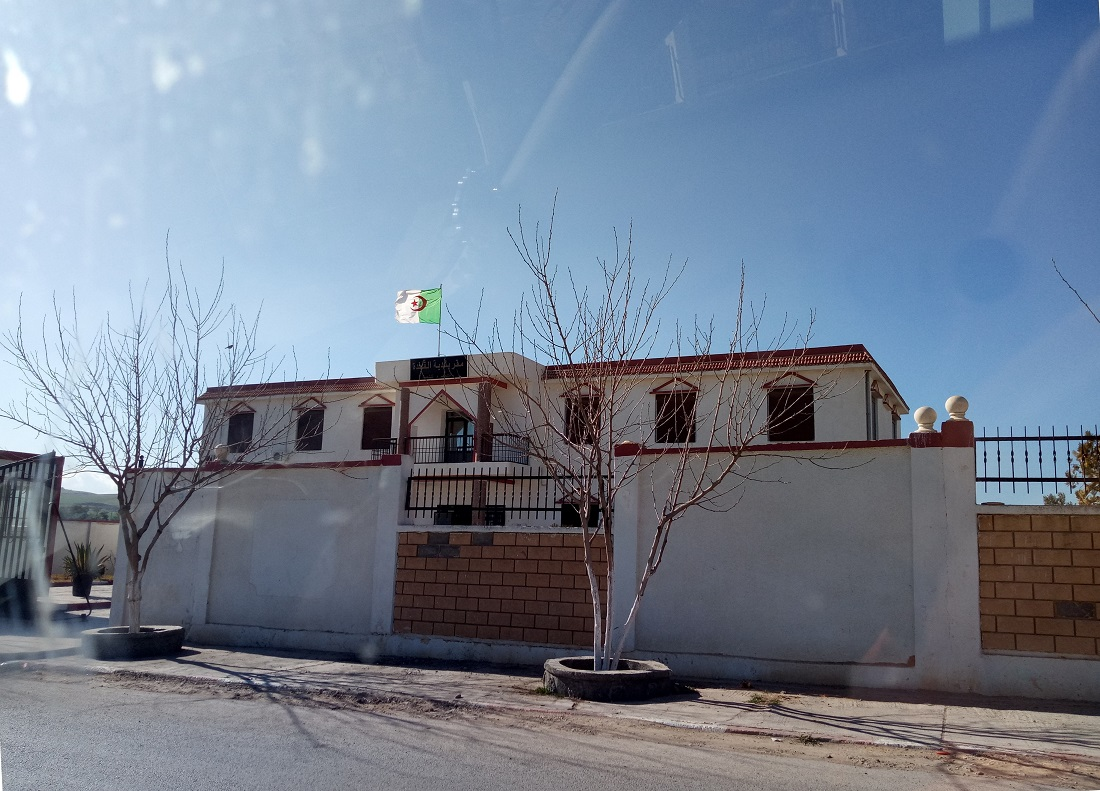
- Interactive map of El Gaada
- Country: Algeria
- Province: Mascara Province

Population (1998)
  - Total: 4,119
- Time zone: UTC+1 (CET)

El Gaada is a town and commune in Mascara Province, Algeria. According to the 1998 census it has a population of 4,119. Among the major families of the city, Al-Mahaja which are the progeny of Al-Shorafa.
