= Mamounia =

Coordinates: 35°26′N 0°08′E

- Commune and town
- Interactive map of Mamounia
- Country: Algeria
- Province: Mascara Province
- Time zone: UTC+1 (CET)

Mamounia is a town and commune in Mascara Province, Algeria.
