= Bou Hanifia =

- Commune and town
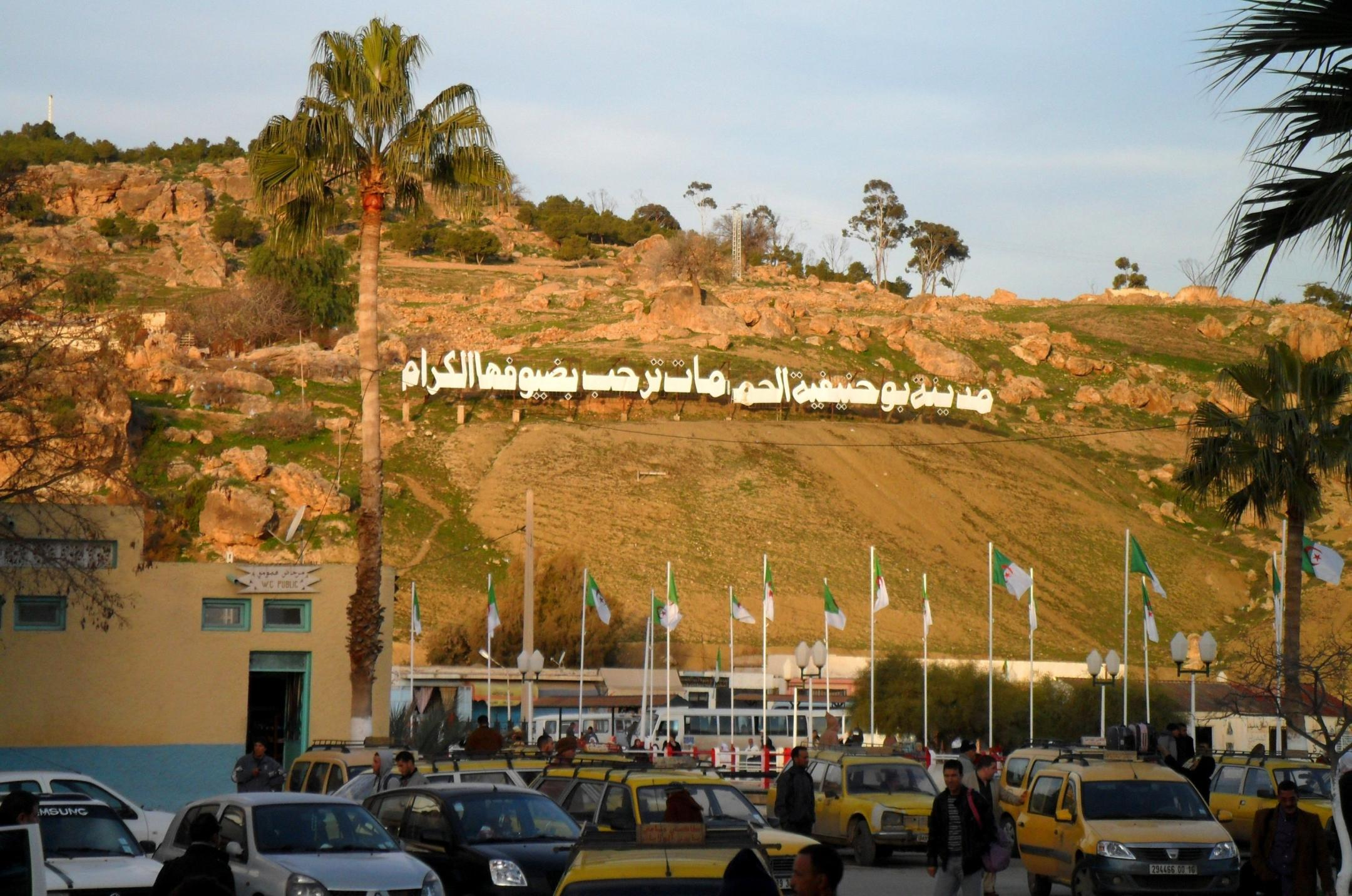

- Location within Algeria
- Country: Algeria
- Province: Mascara Province

Population (1998)
  - Total: 16,953
- Time zone: UTC+1 (CET)

Bou Hanifia is a town and commune located at 35° 18′ 58″ north 0° 02′ 54″ east in Mascara Province, Algeria. According to the 1998 census it has a population of 16,953. and a density of 77 hab./km^{2}

The ruins of the Roman Era city of Aqua Sirenses still litter the area. The ancient city is under threat from agriculture. In 1930 a hydroelectric dam was constructed 4500 meters from the village. This is rockfill dam wall is 460m in height.

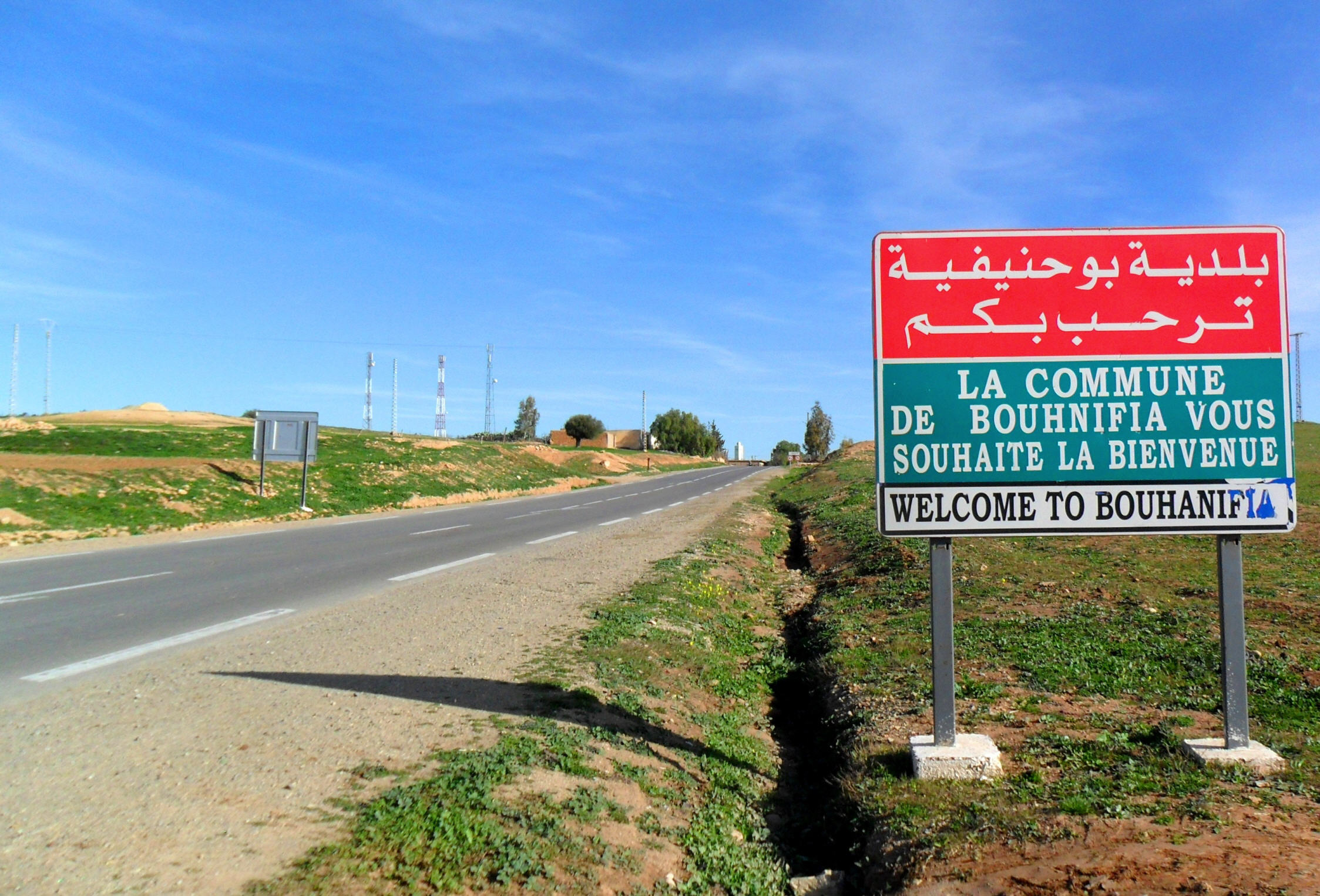
Bou hnifia (Algérie).
