= Matemore =

Coordinates: 35°19′33″N 0°12′49″E

- Commune and town
- Interactive map of Matemore
- Country: Algeria
- Province: Mascara Province
- Time zone: UTC+1 (CET)

Matemore is a town and commune in Mascara Province, Algeria.
