= Hachem =

Coordinates: 35°22′N 0°29′E

Hachem Dombasle (before independence)
- Commune and town
- Interactive map of Hachem
- Country: Algeria
- Province: Mascara Province
- Time zone: UTC+1 (CET)

Hachem is a town and commune in Mascara Province, Algeria.
