= Mascara District =

Coordinates: 35.3833°N 0.1500°E

- District
- Interactive map of Mascara District
- Country: Algeria
- Province: Mascara Province
- Time zone: UTC+1 (CET)

Mascara District is a district of Mascara Province, Algeria.

== Municipalities ==
The district is further divided into 1 municipality:

- Mascara
