= Khalouia =

Coordinates: 35°28′N 0°18′E

- Commune and town
- Interactive map of Khalouia
- Country: Algeria
- Province: Mascara Province

Population (1998)
  - Total: 4,984
- Time zone: UTC+1 (CET)

Khalouia is a town and commune in Mascara Province, Algeria. According to the 1998 census it has a population of 4,984.
