= Nesmoth =

Coordinates: 35°15′15″N 0°22′49″E

- Commune and town
- Interactive map of Nesmoth
- Country: Algeria
- Province: Mascara

Population (1998)
  - Total: 4,414
- Time zone: UTC+1 (CET)

Nesmoth is a town and commune in Mascara Province, Algeria. According to the 1998 census it has a population of 4,414.
