= Sehailia =

Coordinates: 35°27′22″N 0°23′43″E

Sehaîlia
- Commune and town
- Interactive map of Sehaîlia
- Country: Algeria
- Province: Mascara Province

Population (1998)
  - Total: 8,500
- Time zone: UTC+1 (CET)

Sehaîlia is a town and commune in Mascara Province, Algeria. According to the 1998 census it has a population of 8,500.
