= Oued Taria =

Coordinates: 35°07′N 0°05′E

- Commune and town
- Interactive map of Oued Taria
- Country: Algeria
- Province: Mascara Province

Population (1998)
  - Total: 13,916
- Time zone: UTC+1 (CET)

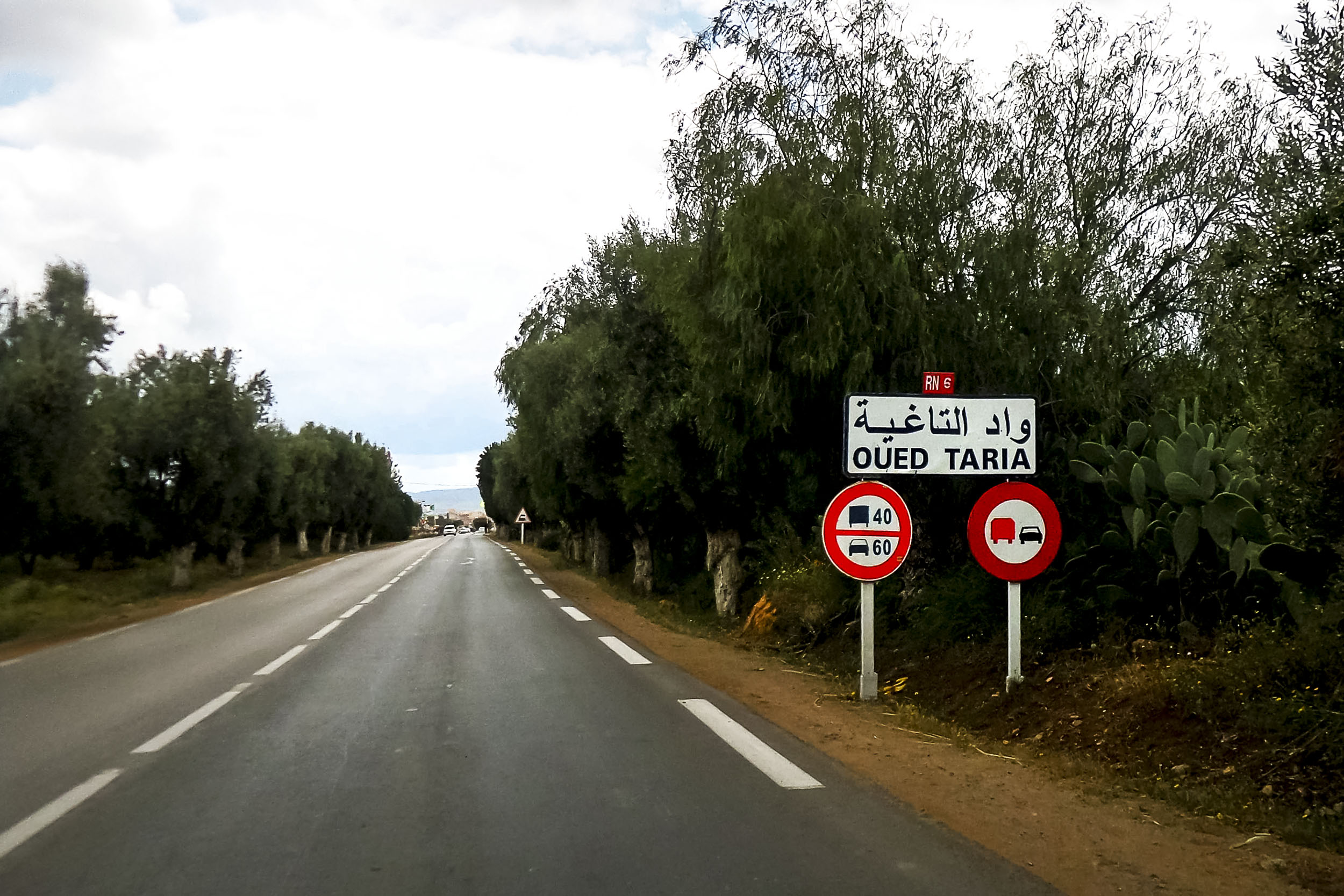

Oued Taria is a town and commune in Mascara Province, Algeria. According to the 1998 census it has a population of 13,916.

The town is known to have some buildings that date back to when the French occupation was in Algeria.
