= Sedjerara =

Coordinates: 35°37′50″N 0°12′50″E

- Commune and town
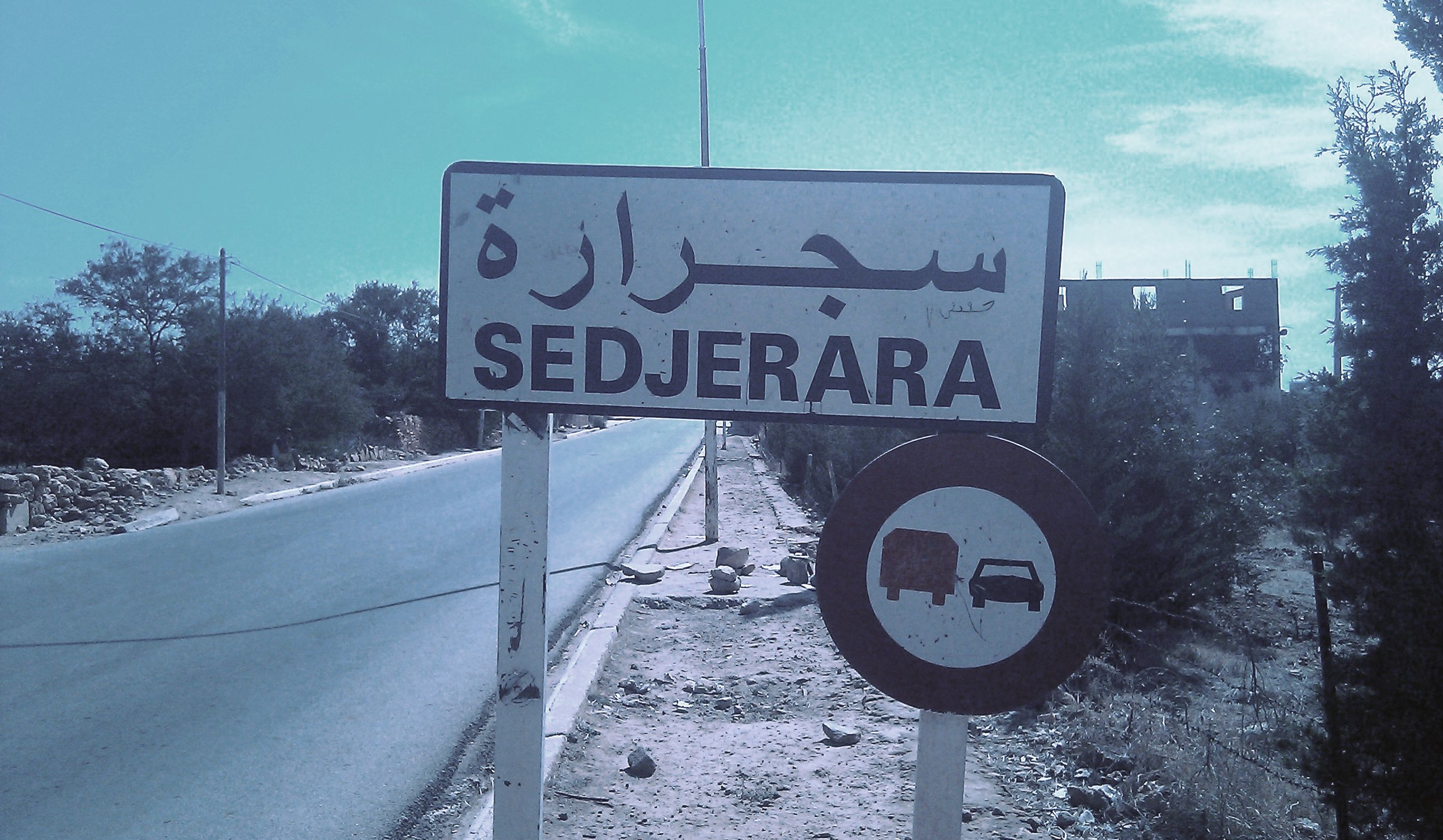

- Country: Algeria
- Province: Mascara Province

Population (1998)
  - Total: 7,819
- Time zone: UTC+1 (CET)

Sedjerara is a town and commune in Mascara Province, Algeria. According to the 1998 census it has a population of 7,819.
