= Zalam =

- Municipality
- Location within Azerbaijan Location within Shaki-Zagatala Economic Region
- Coordinates: 40°50′29″N 47°47′57″E
- Country: Azerbaijan
- Rayon: Qabala

Population
  - Total: 691
- Time zone: UTC+4 (AZT)
  - Summer (DST): UTC+5 (AZT)

Zalam is a village and municipality in the Qabala Rayon of Azerbaijan. It has a population of 691. The municipality consists of the villages of Zalam and Mollaşıxalı.

== See also ==
- Qabala District
