= Beniane =

Village in Algeria

Coordinates: 35°06′N 0°14′E

- Commune and town
- Interactive map of Beniane
- Country: Algeria
- Province: Mascara Province

Population (1998)
  - Total: 4,530
- Time zone: UTC+1 (CET)

Beniane (Colonial French Bénian) is a town and commune in Mascara Province, Algeria at the site of ancient Ala Miliaria, a former bishopric which earns a Latin Catholic titular see.

According to the 1998 census it has a population of 4,530.

== History ==
Modern Beniane corresponds to the ancient city of Ala Miliaria in the Roman province of Mauretania Caesariensis, which was important enough to be one of the many suffragans of the capital Caesarea Mauretaniae's Metropolitan Archbishopric.

It was the episcopal see of Mensius, one of the Catholic bishops whom the Arian Vandal king Huneric summoned to Carthage in 484 and then exiled. Archaeological excavations in the early 20th century brought to light inscriptions showing that there was a strong Donatist presence in Ala Miliaria, with bishops named Nemessanus (404-422) and Donatus (c. 439).

=== Titular see ===
No longer a residential bishopric, Ala Miliaria is today listed by the Catholic Church as a titular bishopric since the diocese was nominally restored in 1933.

It has had the following incumbents, of the lowest (episcopal) rank:

- Titular bishop Nicholas Laudadio, Jesuits (S.J.) (1964.05.26 – 1969.04.01)
- Titular bishop Antoni Adamiuk (1970.06.06 – 2000.01.25)
- Titular bishop Rainer Klug (2000.05.23 – ...), Auxiliary Bishop emeritus of Freiburg im Breisgau (Germany)

== Sources and external links ==
- GCatholic with titular incumbent bio links
