= Zelameta =

- Commune and town
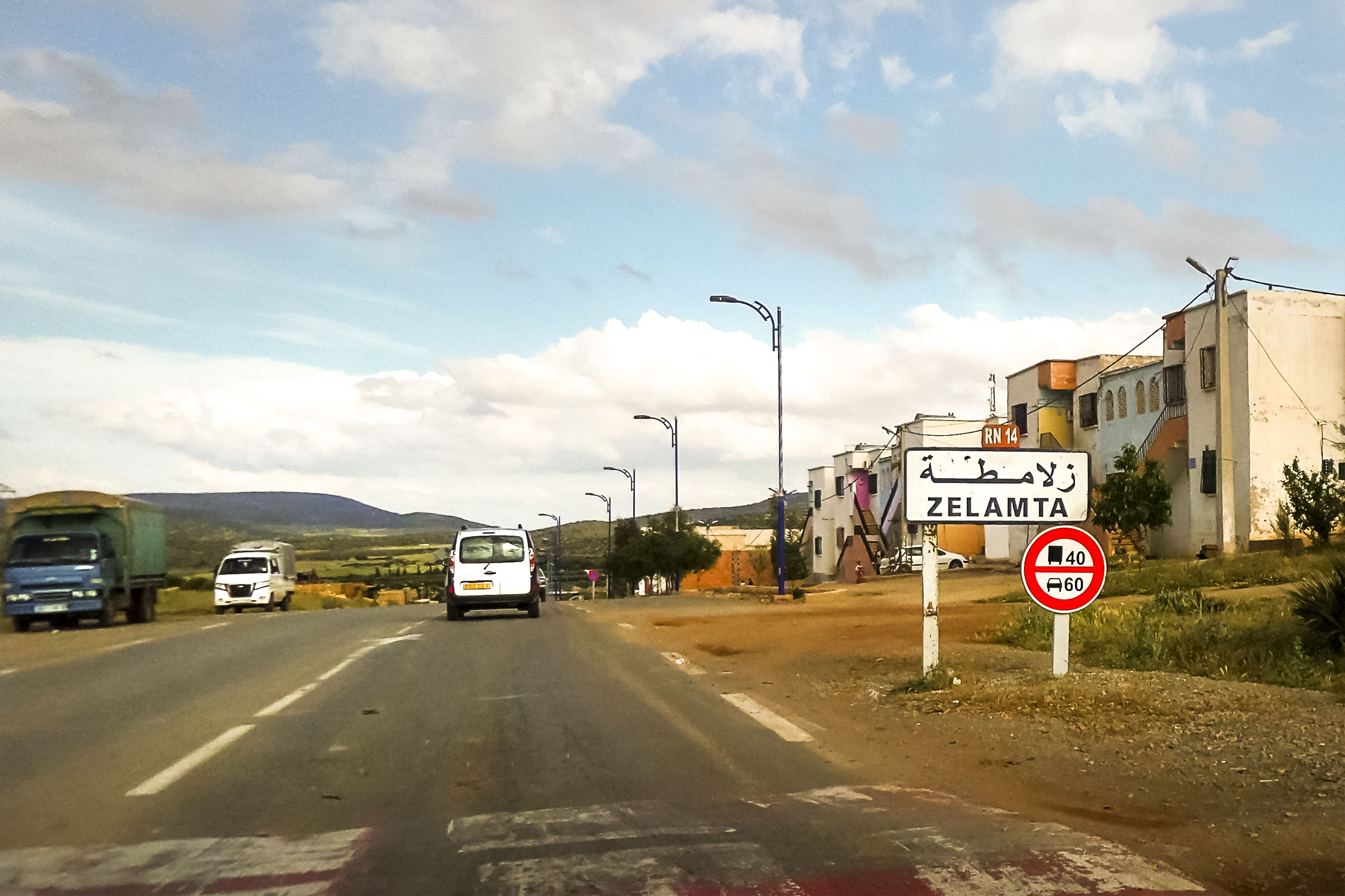

- Location within Algeria
- Coordinates: 35.29108°N 0.47622°E
- Country: Algeria
- Province: Mascara Province
- Time zone: UTC+1 (CET)

Zelameta is a town and commune in Mascara Province, Algeria.
