= El Menaouer =

Coordinates: 35°32′25″N 0°22′17″E

- Commune and town
- Interactive map of El Menaouer
- Country: Algeria
- Province: Mascara Province

Population (1998)
  - Total: 9,346
- Time zone: UTC+1 (CET)

El Menaouer is a town and commune in Mascara Province, Algeria. According to the 1998 census it has a population of 9,346.
