= Mascara Province =

Province of Algeria

Mascara Province ولاية معسكر
- Province
- Map of Algeria highlighting Mascara
- Coordinates: 35°24′N 0°8′E
- Country: Algeria
- Capital: Mascara

Government
  - Wāli: Fouad Aiss

Area
  - Total: 5,941 km^{2} (2,294 sq mi)

Population (2008)
  - Total: 780,959
  - Density: 131.5/km^{2} (340.5/sq mi)
- Time zone: UTC+01 (CET)
- Area Code: +213 (0) 45
- ISO 3166 code: DZ-29
- Districts: 16
- Municipalities: 47

Mascara (Arabic: معسكر Muʿaskar, Berber languages: ⵎⵄⴻⵙⴽⴻⵔ Mɛesker) is a province (wilaya) in Algeria, named after its capital, whose name is Arabic for "military garrison". It is uncertain whether the place's name is related to "mascara", the cosmetic. Another important locality is the town of Sig.

== History ==
The province was created from parts of Mostaganem department and Oran (department) in 1974.

== Administrative divisions ==
The province is divided into 16 districts (daïras), which are further divided into 47 communes or municipalities.

=== Districts ===
1. Aïn Farès
2. Aïn Fekan
3. Aouf
4. Bouhanifia
5. El Bordj
6. Ghriss
7. Hachem
8. Mascara
9. Mohammedia
10. Oggaz
11. Ouled Attia
12. Oued Taria
13. Sig
14. Tighenif
15. Tizi
16. Zahana

=== Communes ===
1. Aïn Fares
2. Aïn Fekan
3. Aïn Ferah
4. Aïn Fras
5. Alaimia
6. Aouf
7. Beniane
8. Bou Hanifia
9. Bou Henni
10. Chorfa
11. El Bordj
12. El Gaada
13. El Ghomri
14. Hachem
15. El Keurt
16. El Menaouer
17. Ferraguig
18. Froha
19. Gharrous
20. Guerdjoum
21. Guittena
22. Ghriss
23. Mamounia
24. Hacine
25. Khalouia
26. Makdha
27. Maoussa
28. Mascara
29. Matemore
30. Mocta Douz
31. Mohammadia
32. Nesmoth
33. Oggaz
34. Oued El Abtal
35. Oued Taria
36. Ras Ain Amirouche
37. Sedjerara
38. Sehaîlia
39. Sidi Abdeldjebar
40. Sidi Abdelmoumen
41. Sidi Kada
42. Sidi Boussaid
43. Sig
44. Tighennif
45. Tizi
46. Zeralda Forest
47. Zahana
48. Zelameta

== 1994 earthquake ==
There was an earthquake in the capital of Mascara City on 18 August 1994. The 5.9 Mw oblique-slip shock left 159 dead, 289 injured, and 8,000–10,000 homeless.

== Notable people ==
- Emir Abdelkader (1808–1883)
- Emir Mustapha (1814 – 1863)
- Rachid Taha (1958 – 2018)
