= El Bordj =

Coordinates: 35°30′57″N 0°18′06″E

- Commune and town
- Interactive map of El Bordj
- Country: Algeria
- Province: Mascara Province

Population (1998)
  - Total: 17,874
- Time zone: UTC+1 (CET)

El Bordj is a town and commune in Mascara Province, Algeria. According to the 1998 census it has a population of 17,874.
