= Sidi Boussaid =

Coordinates: 35°17′26″N 0°17′47″E

- Commune and town
- Interactive map of Sidi Boussaid
- Country: Algeria
- Province: Mascara Province

Population (2012)
  - Total: 5,873
- Time zone: UTC+1 (CET)

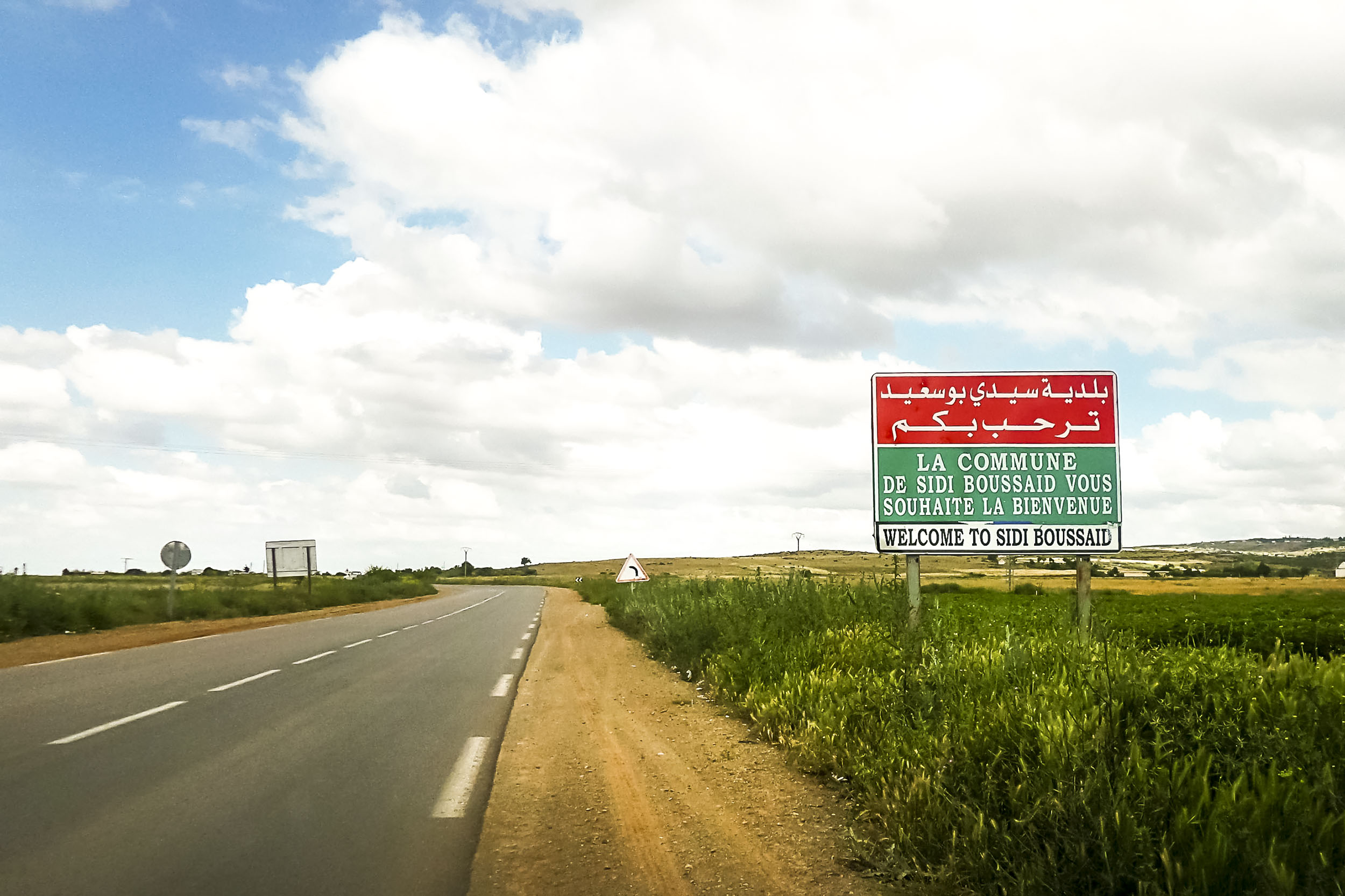
Sidi Boussaid

Sidi Boussaid is a town and commune in Mascara Province, Algeria. According to the 2012 census it has a population of 5873.
