= Sidi Abdelmoumen, Algeria =

Coordinates: 35°39′10″N 0°00′50″E

Sidi Abdelmoumen
- Commune and town
- Interactive map of Sidi Abdelmoumen
- Country: Algeria
- Province: Mascara Province

Population (1998)
  - Total: 13,306
- Time zone: UTC+1 (CET)

Sidi Abdelmoumen is a town and commune in Mascara Province, Algeria. According to the 1998 census it has a population of 13,306.
