= Mascara, Algeria =

Mascara معسكر
- City
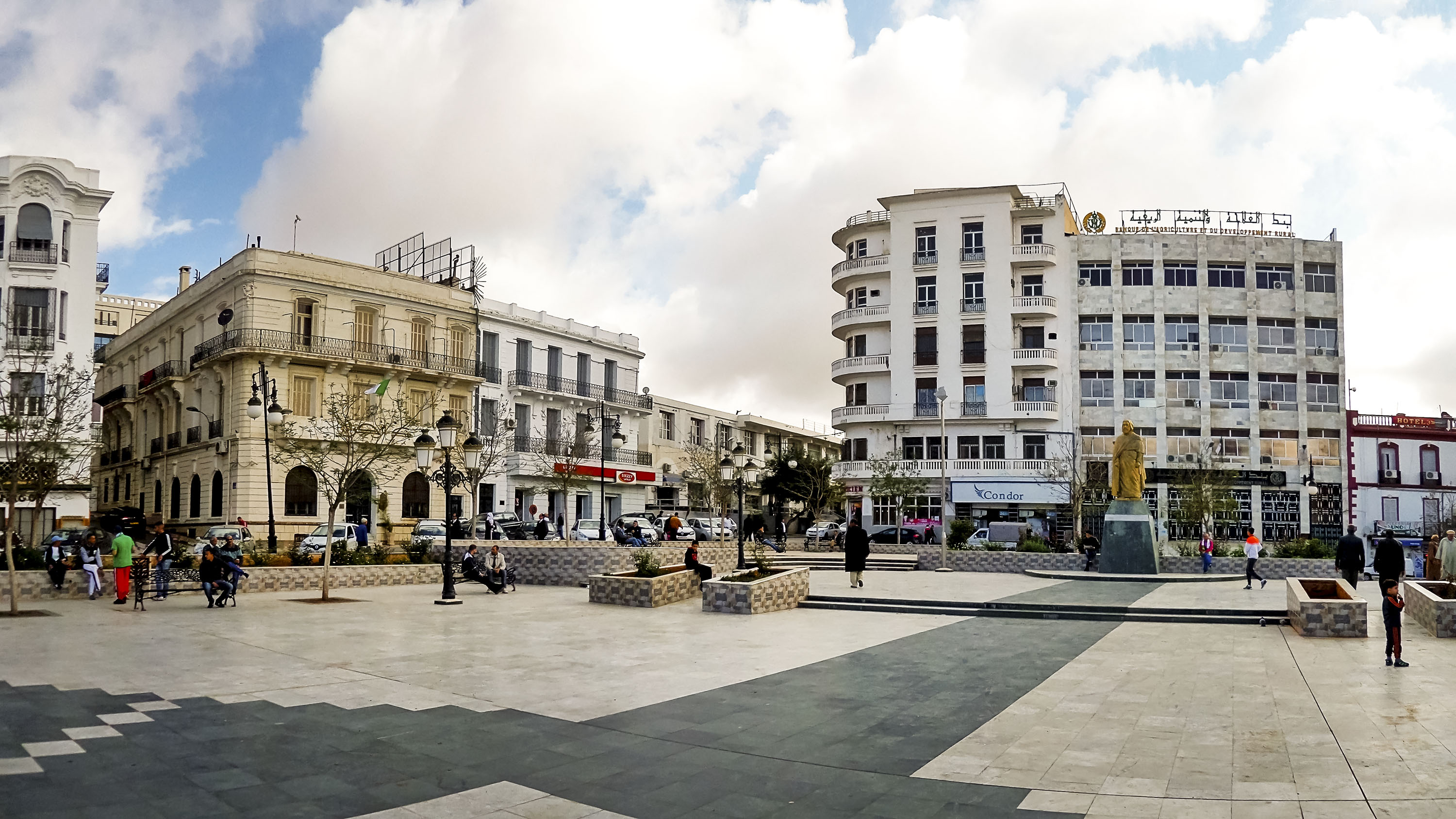
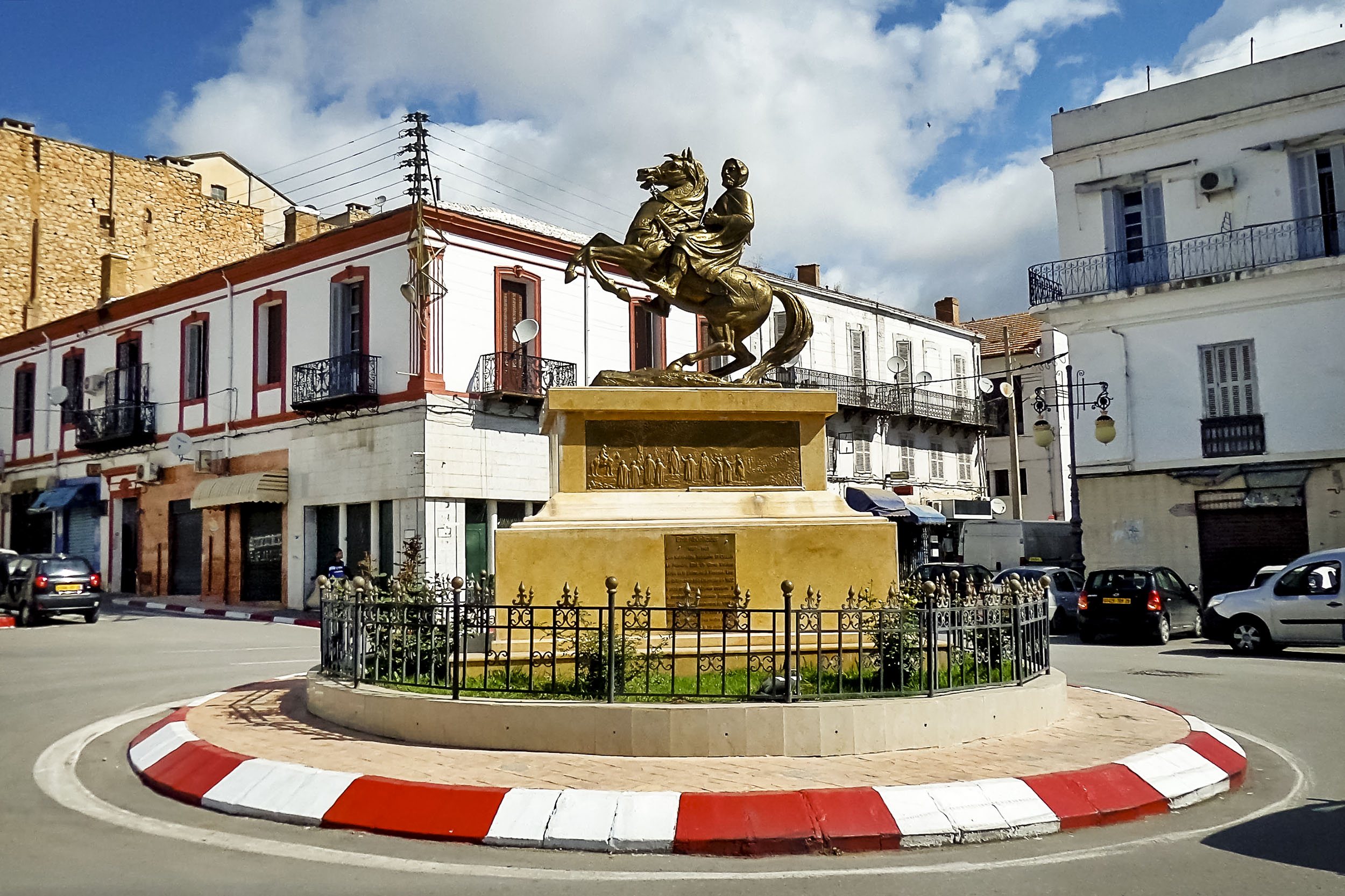
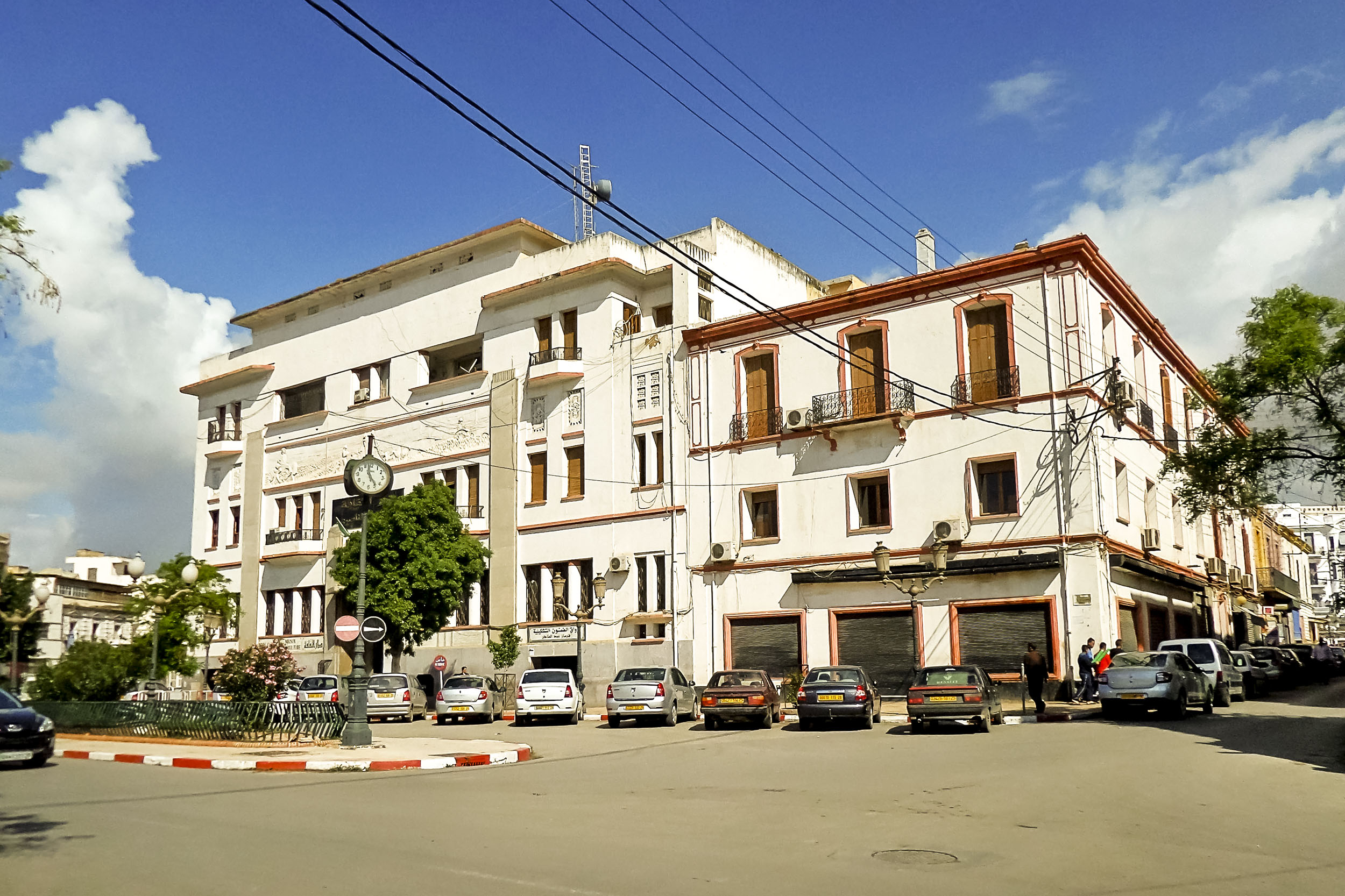
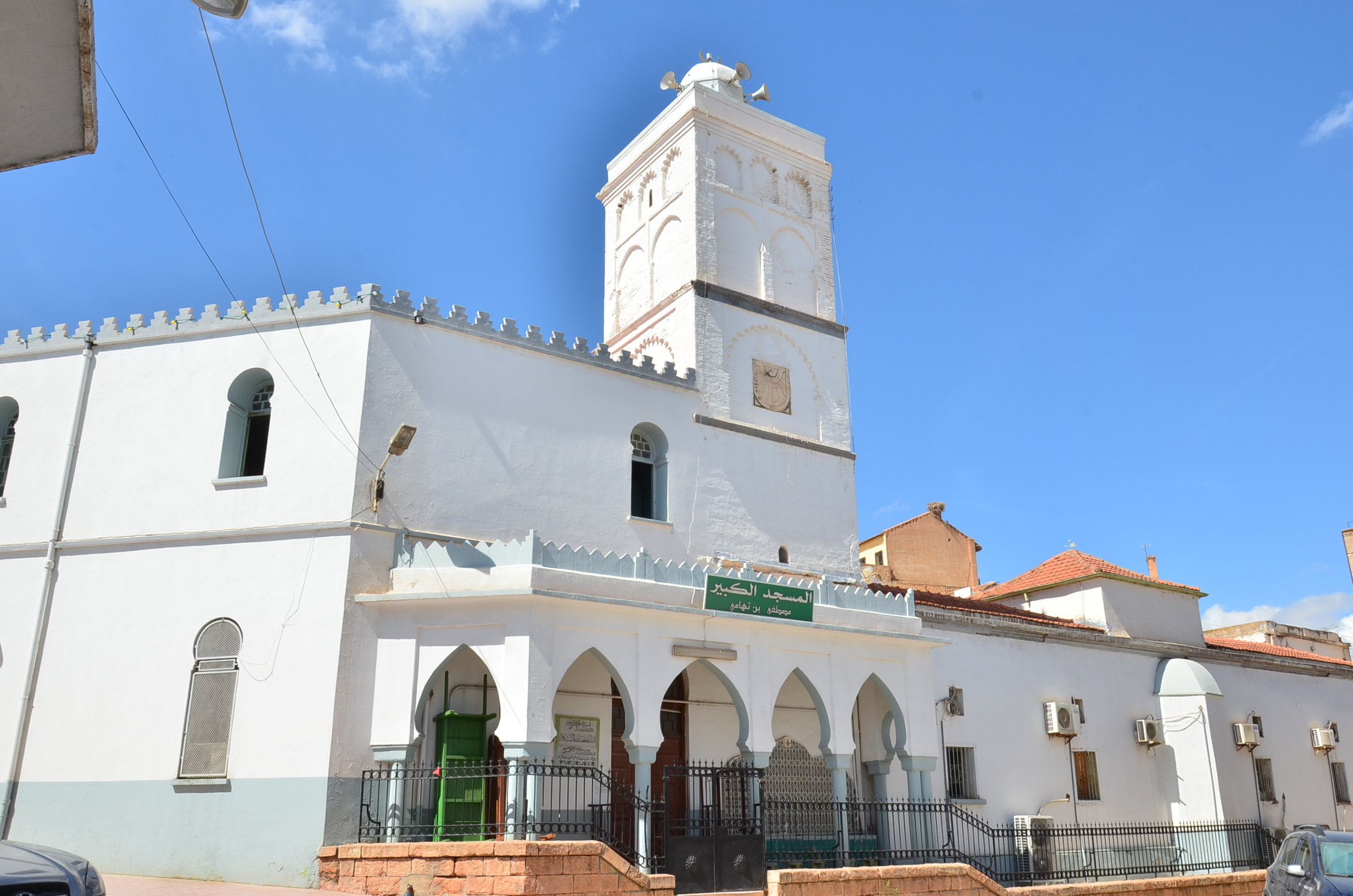
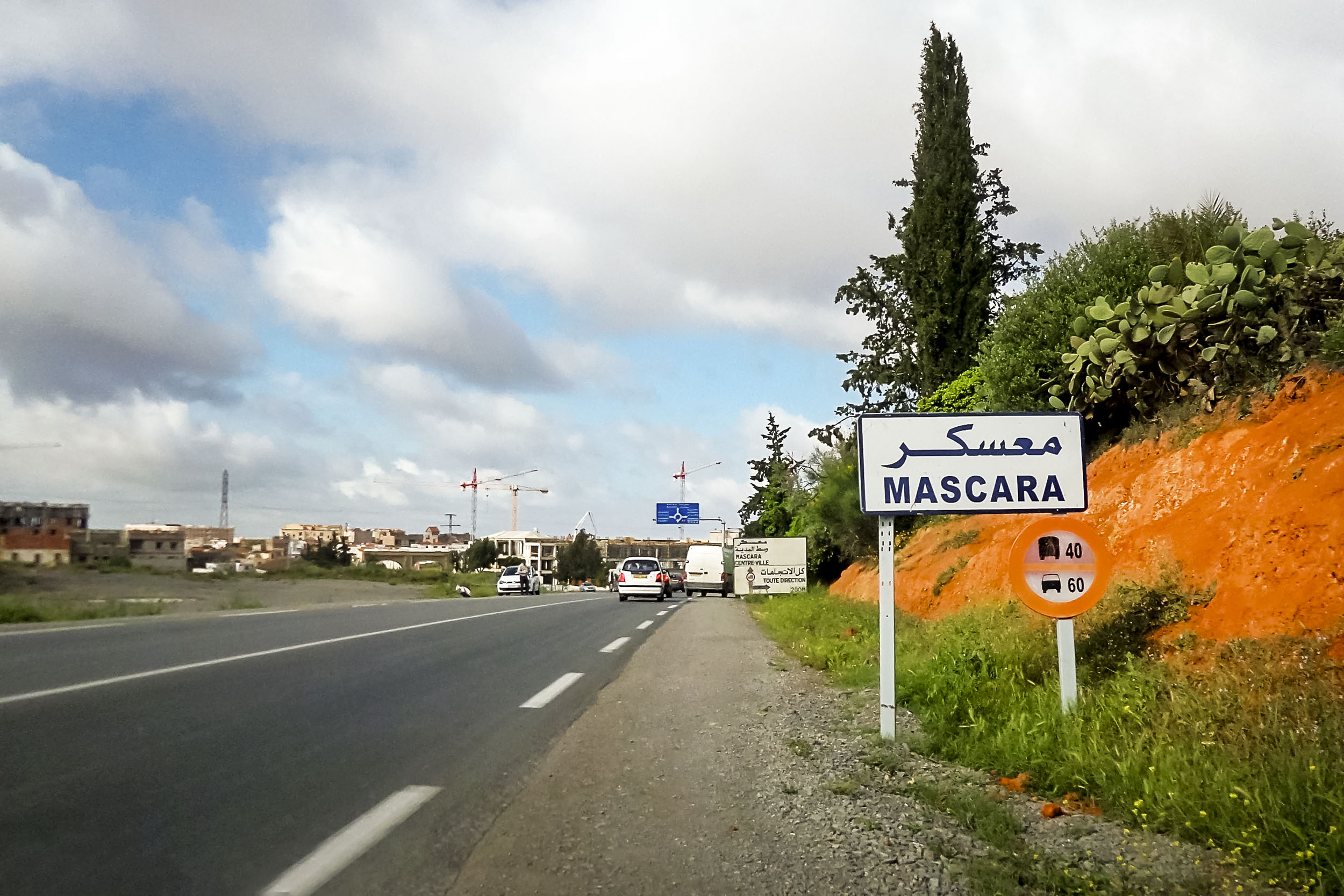
- Overview of Mascara

- Flag

- Location of Mascara within Mascara Province

- Location of Mascara within Algeria
- Coordinates: 35.4°N 0.133333°E
- Country: Algeria
- Province: Mascara Province
- District: Mascara District
- Founded: 1701
- Highest elevation: 429 m (1,407 ft)
- Lowest elevation: 0 m (0 ft)

Population (2008 census)
  - Total: 108,629
- Time zone: UTC+1 (+1)
- Postal code: 29000

Mascara (Arabic: معسكر, romanized: Muʿaskar) (Berber languages: ⵎⵄⴻⵙⴽⴻⵔ), also spelled Maskara, is the capital city of Mascara Province in Algeria. It has 150,000 inhabitants (2008 estimate). It was founded in the 10th century by the Banu Ifran, and is famous for being the hometown of Emir Abd al-Qadir, a leader of the Algerian resistance to early French colonial rule in the 19th century.

Mascara is an administrative, commercial and a market centre. Its trade is mostly centered on leather goods, grains, and olive oil, but it is especially famous for its good wine. It has good road and rail connections with other urban centres of Algeria. Relizane is 65 kilometres (40 miles) northeast, Sidi Bel Abbès 90 km (56 mi) southwest, Oran 105 kkm northwest and Saïda 80 km (50 mi) south.

Mascara has two parts, a newer French area, and an older Muslim one. Large parts of the town lie inside the ruins of its ancient ramparts. The city is the home of Lakhdar Belloumi, a former Algerian football (soccer) star.

== Etymology ==
The origin of the name Mascara is said to be the deformation of an ancient name, either Oum El Asker which means "the mother of soldiers", or Mo'asker which means "the place where soldiers gather". The name is pronounced locally, Mʿaskar. French colonization caused the city's name to be adopted in the French version as an official name.The name "Mascara" was likely given in reference to the city that bears the same name, since in the mid-19th century the French discovered antimony powder during their conquest in the old town of Mascara in Algeria. The nomadic tribes used the cosmetic as a beauty product but also to protect themselves from various trachomas and eye diseases.

== History ==
=== Regency of Algiers ===
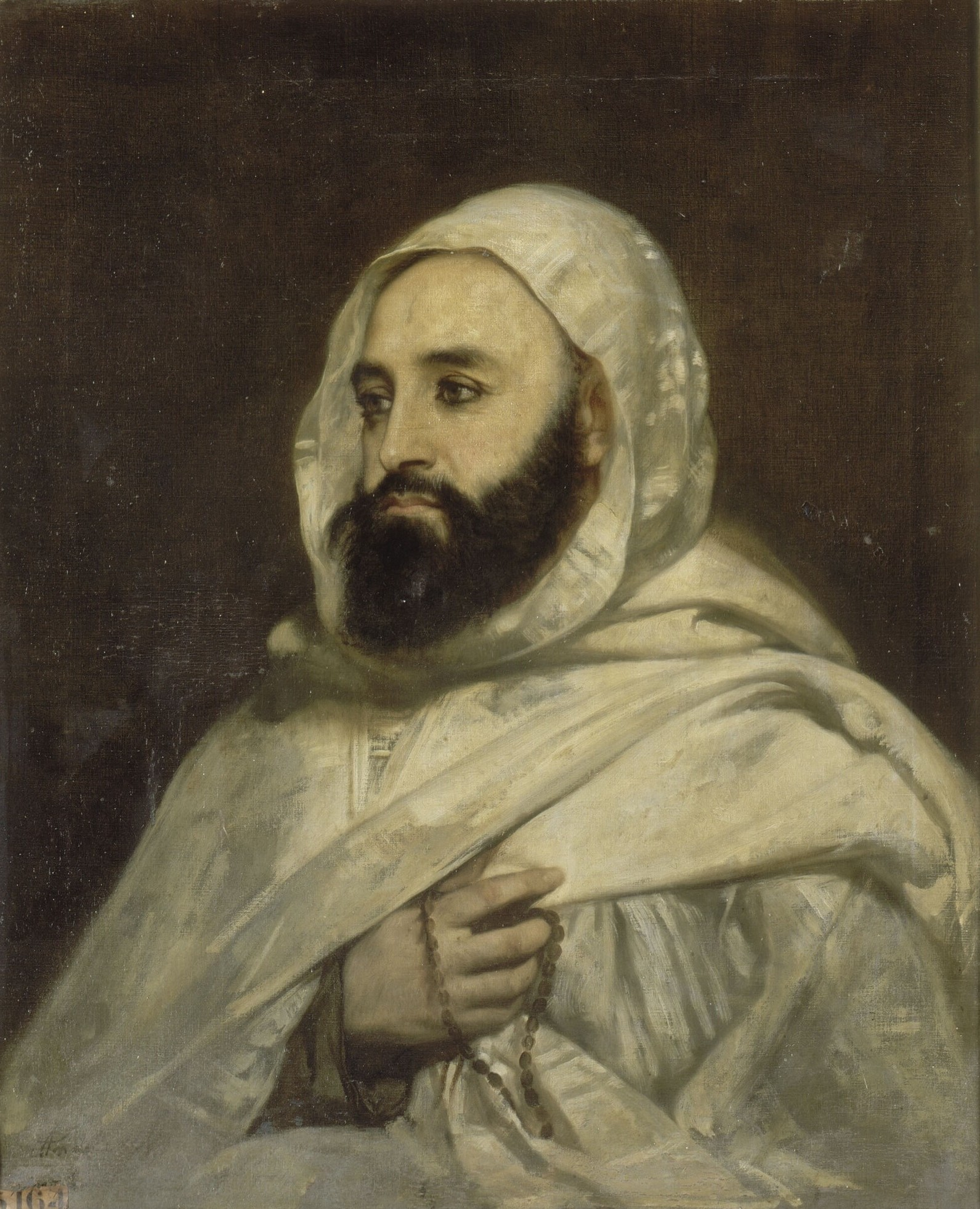
Emir Abd al-Qadir.

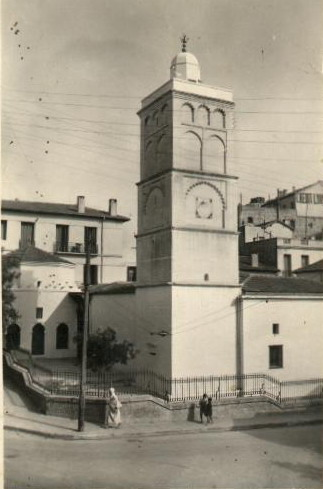
Grande Mosque

- 1701: During the Regency of Algiers, Algerian built a military garrison in the town. Many Muslims with Andalucian origins were settled there by the Ottomans and Algerians.
- 1708: The Muslim tribes of Mascara led by the bey Mustapha Ben Youcef captured the city of Oran and expelled the Spaniards while they were busy in the War of the Spanish Succession.
- 1732: Spain regains control of Oran.
- 1790: Famine and sickness had begun to aggravate the situation in Oran when the bey of Mascara appeared before the town with 30,000 men. The Spanish commander held out till August 1791, when the Spanish government, having made terms with the bey of Algiers, was allowed to set sail for Spain with their guns and ammunition. The bey Mohammed took possession of Oran in March 1792, and made it his residence instead of Mascara.

=== French invasion and early French rule ===
- 1832: Abd al-Qadir makes Mascara his headquarters.
- 1835: Mascara is destroyed by the French.
- 1841: The French establish full control over Mascara.

=== Algeria (sovereign state) ===
- August 18, 1994: An earthquake measuring 5.7 on the moment magnitude scale and having a maximum MSK intensity of VIII (Damaging) leaves 171 people dead in Mascara.

== Twin towns/sister cities ==
Mascara is twinned with:

- Bursa, Turkey
- Elkader, Iowa, United States
- (Sahrawi Arab Democratic Republic) Tifariti, Saharawi Arab Democratic Republic
