= Mohammadia, Mascara =

Mohammadia المحمدية
- Commune and town
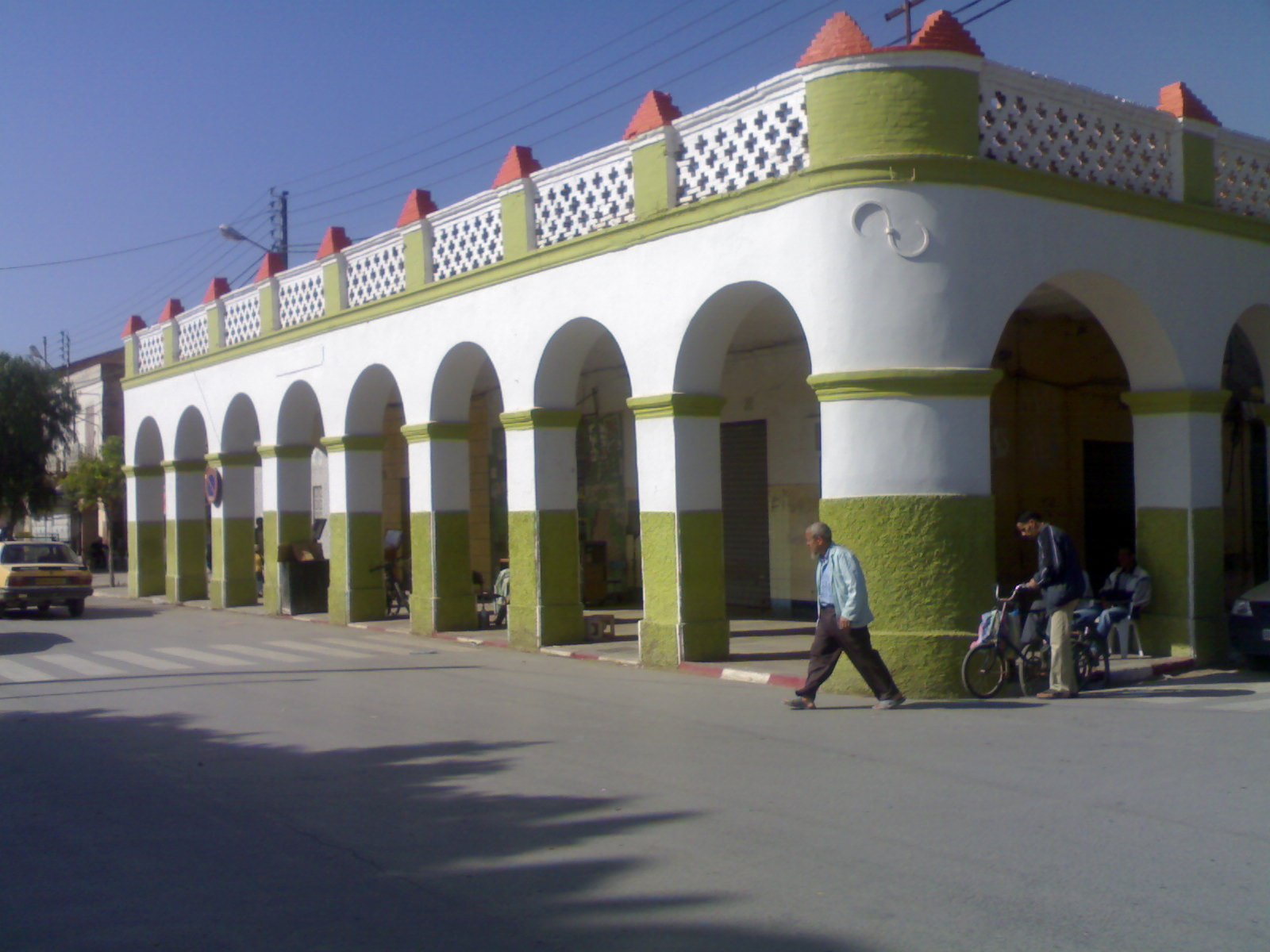
- downtown, arcades

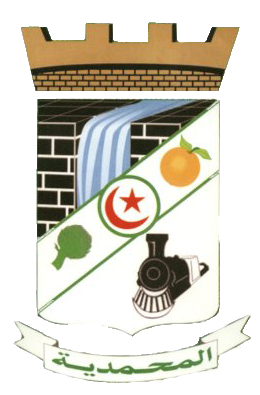
- Seal

- Location within Algeria
- Coordinates: 35°35′N 0°4′E
- Country: Algeria
- Province: Mascara Province
- District: Mohammadia District

Population (2008)
  - Total: 84,700
- Time zone: UTC+1 (CET)

Mohammadia is a town and commune in Mascara Province, Algeria. According to the 1998 census it has a population of 71,366. It is 80 km southeast of Oran and 35 km north of Mascara. Under the name Perregaux, the city was founded by French colonists on the ruins of the Roman city of Castra Nova.

== History ==
=== Pre-colonial period ===
Very few writings relate the pre-construction of Perregaux. What is certain is that the whole region was a scrubby plain populated with tamarind woods difficult to access because in rainy season, it was likely to retain water. Swamps swarmed in the plain of El Habra. Mosquitoes and dangerous animals made the setting up of an urban gathering technically difficult; according to the means available before the industrial revolution. The tribes who lived in the heights of the plain could graze their herds of oxen and sheep and cultivate on the borders of cereals.

Some historians (Robert Thintoi) assume that the ancient Roman city could be built on the current Mohammadia.

The town served as an agricultural hub during the French colonial period and has continued to do so in modern times, especially for its production of citrus fruits.

In 1865, the French colonial administration constructed the Farquq dam on the Oued El-Hammam south of town, which has since burst its banks three times, in 1872, 1881, and 1927, all times seriously damaging parts of Mohammadia.

== Geography ==
The town is located in the northern end of Mascara Province, on the Habra plains. The Oued (river) El-Hammam runs through the city northwards towards the Mediterranean. The Tell Atlas range runs west-east at the southern edges of the town.

== Economy ==
Mohammadia is famous with its large fields of oranges fruit, and it is growing with a high quality comparing to the other towns because of its soil.
