= Arabeya Valley =

Valley in the Kabylie region, Algeria

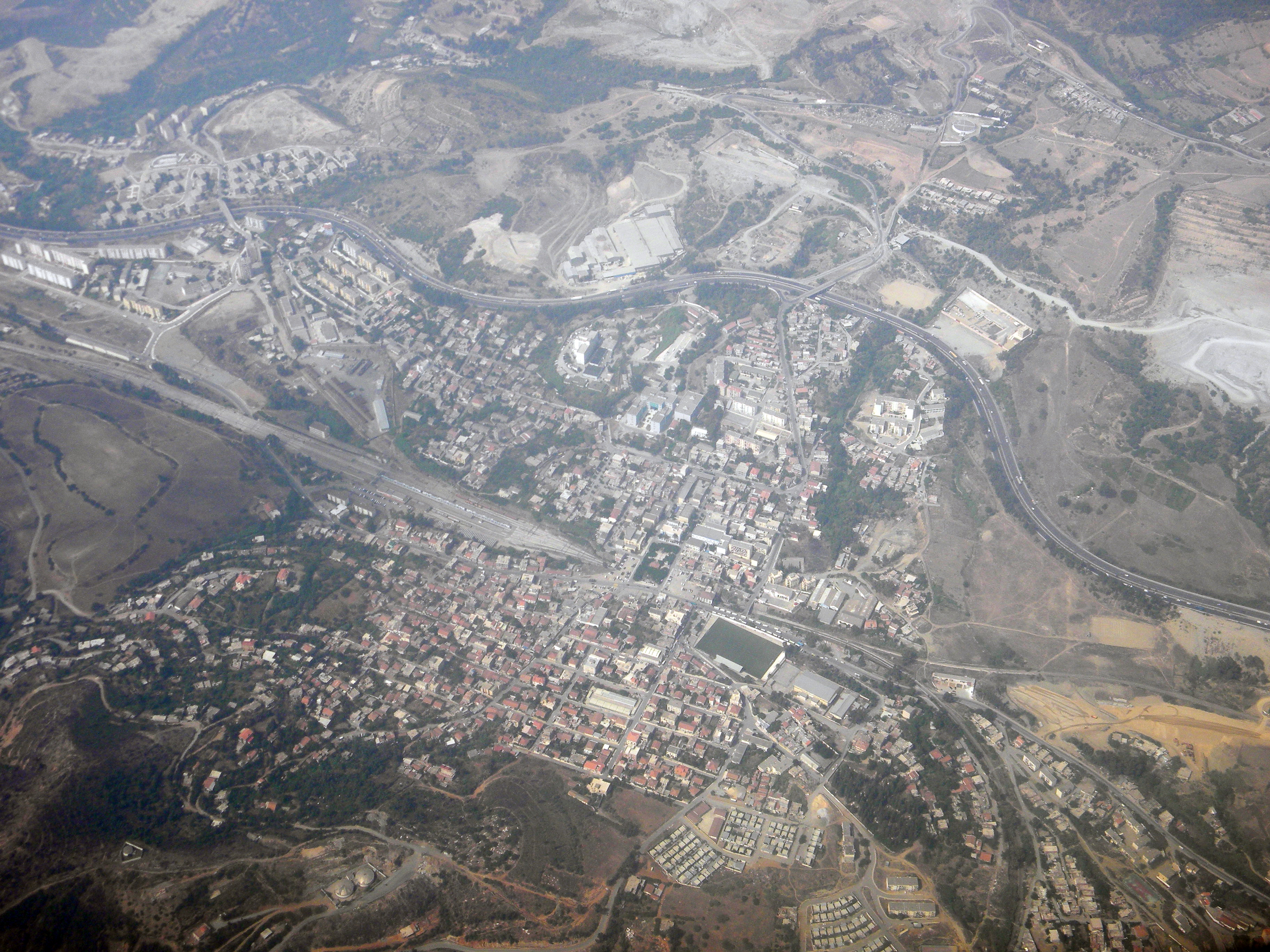
- Arabeya Valley stream in the center of the city of Thenia

Location
- Country: Algeria

Physical characteristics
- Source: Tell Atlas, Khachna, Boumerdès Province
  - coordinates: 36.6667°N 3.6667°E
  - elevation: 624 m (2,047 ft; 341 fathoms), Boumerdès Province: Beni Amrane
- 2nd source: Tell Atlas, Boumerdès Province
  - elevation: 583 m (1,913 ft; 319 fathoms), Boumerdès Province, Tidjelabine
- Source confluence: Boumerdès Province
  - elevation: 45 m (148 ft; 25 fathoms)
- Mouth: Boumerdès Province: Issers
  - coordinates: 36.7258°N 3.5578°E
  - elevation: 5 m (16 ft; 2.7 fathoms), Mediterranean Sea
- Length: 20 km (12 mi)
- Basin size: 1.200 km^{2} (0.463 sq mi)

Basin features
- Landmarks: Algeria: Boumerdès Province: Beni Amrane, Tidjelabine, Si-Mustapha, Issers.

Arabeya Valley, (also known as Wadi Arabiya or Wadi Thinia Bani Aisha), is a watercourse originating from the Khachna Mountains of Algeria. It flows through the Kabylia region, eventually draining into Isser River and then into the Mediterranean Sea, passing through the Boumerdès Governorate.

== Watercourse ==
Arabeya Valley channel is characterized by the absence of schist and soil materials in its bed. This feature, shared by this watercourse along with Meraldene River, Boumerdès Valley, and Isser River, allows for the extraction of sand and gravel for use in mortar and concrete preparation. Wadi Arabiya is considered a true corridor, with its width ranging between 5 meters and 600 meters. It gradually slopes from its intersection with Wadi Boumerdès at Mount Bouaârous in the west, heading towards its mouth in Isser River, east of the city of Thénia.

== The path ==
Arabeya Valley runs through one coastal Algerian province.

Municipalities in Boumerdès are part of the "Wadi Arabia" pathway
Number	Boumerdès Province
01	Beni Amrane
02	Tidjelabine
03	Thénia
04	Si-Mustapha
05	Issers

== Valleys ==
Arabeya Valley intersects with several other valleys in the Boumerdès along its course through the Khachna Mountains.

Valleys along the path of "Arabeya Valley"
Number	Boumerdès Province
01	Borden Valley
02	Meraldene River
03	Boumerdès Valley
04	Bovron Valley
05	Isser River

== Dams ==
Arabeya Valley passes through several dams in the Boumerdès along its course through the Khachna Mountains.

Dams in the path of Arabeya Valley
Number	Boumerdès Province
01	Meraldene Dam

== National roads ==
Arabeya Valley intersects with several national roads as it crosses the Boumerdès in the Khachna Mountains.

National roads in the path of "Arabeya Valley"
Number	Boumerdès Province
01	National Road No.5
02	National Road No.12

== Gallery ==
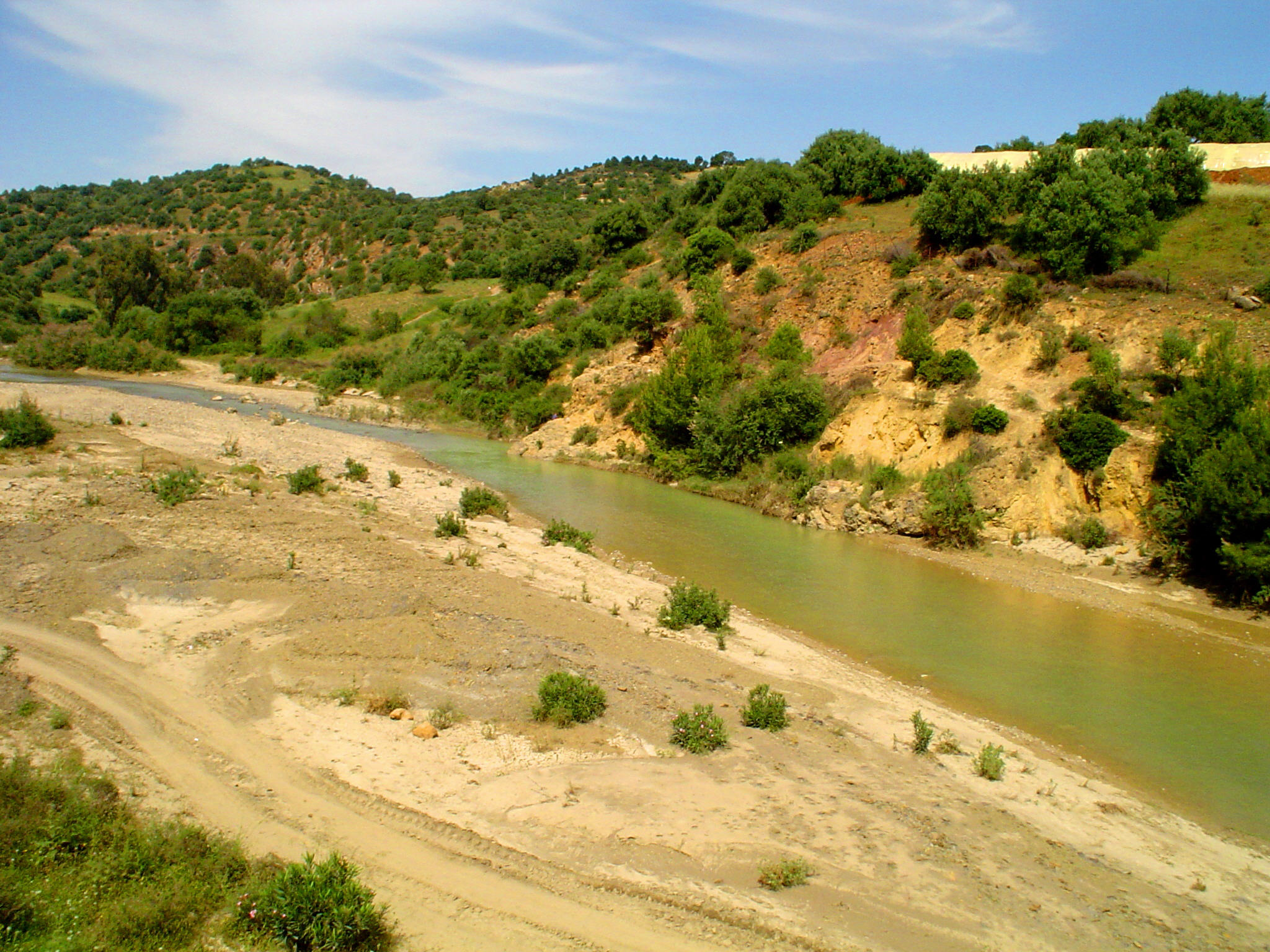
The course of Isser River

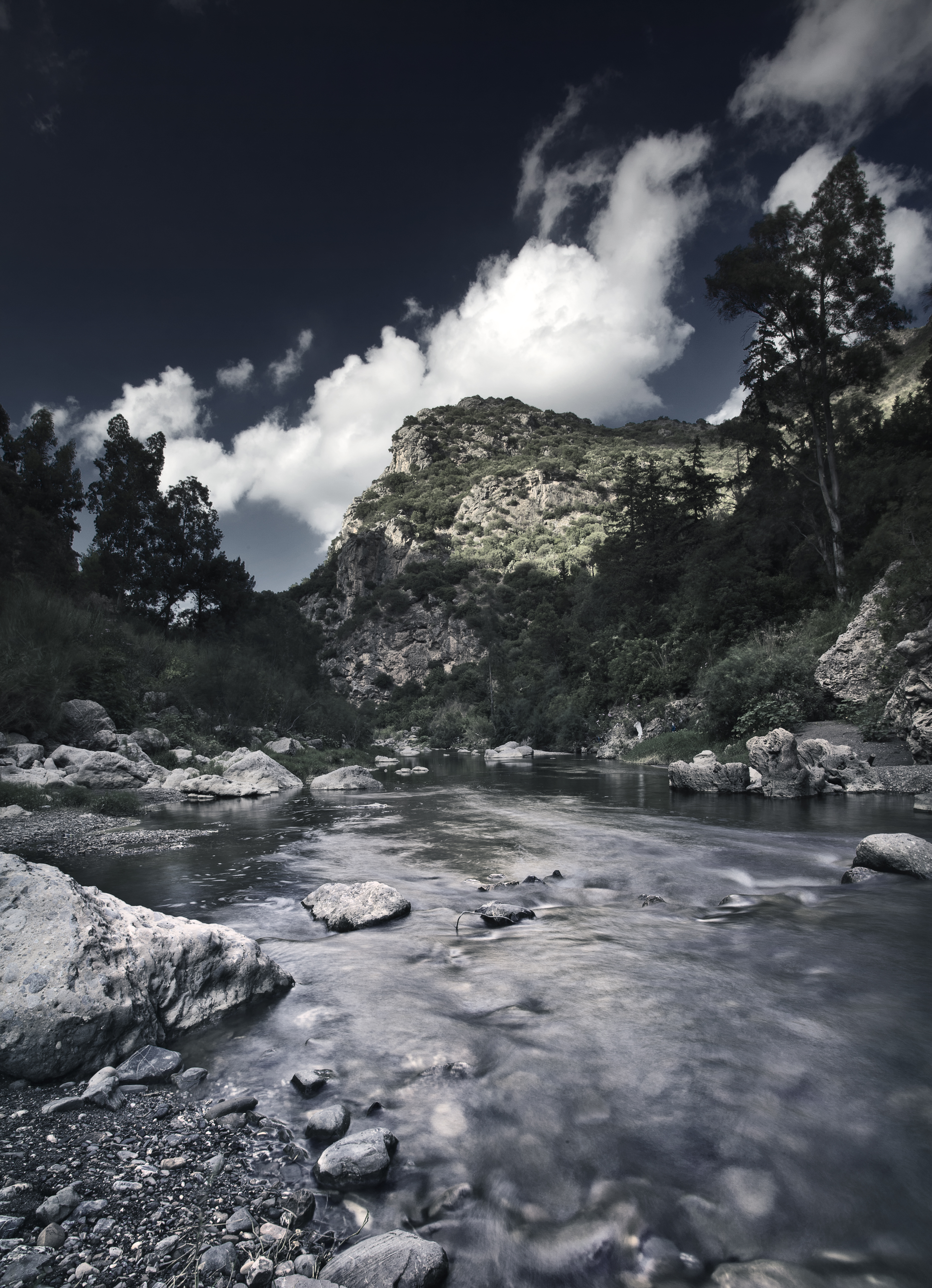
The course of Isser River

== See also ==
- List of rivers of Algeria
- Ministry of Water Resources and Environment
- Discharge regime
- Tell Atlas
- Khachna
- Boumerdès Province
- List of beaches
- Tourism in Algeria
- Lists of tourist attractions
