= Meraldene (disambiguation) =

Meraldene is a village in Algeria.

Meraldene may also refer to:

- Meraldene Dam, a dam in Algeria
- Meraldene River, a river in Algeria
