= Vagalitanus =

Town in Roman empire

Vagal or Vagalitanus was a Vandal and Roman era civitas (town) in Mauretania Caesariensis, Roman North Africa. The town has been tentatively identified with Sidi ben Thiour on the Mekerra River near its confluence with the Sly River.(36.073819n, 1.094881e) Nearby towns included Castellum Tingitanum (El Asnam) and Catabum Castra (Djidioua). The mines at Malakoff were to the north-east of the town.

== History ==
The town was founded some time before 30 BC and continued till about 640 AD.

== Bishopric ==
The town was also the seat of an ancient bishopric. The city's Donatist bishop Miggin attended the Council of Carthage (411) and the Catholic bishop Claudius, is known from 484 AD. The bishopric ceased effective activities with the arrival of the Islamic armies, but was reestablished in name in the 20th century and has had four titular bishops since. The current bishop is Miguel Romano Gómez.
