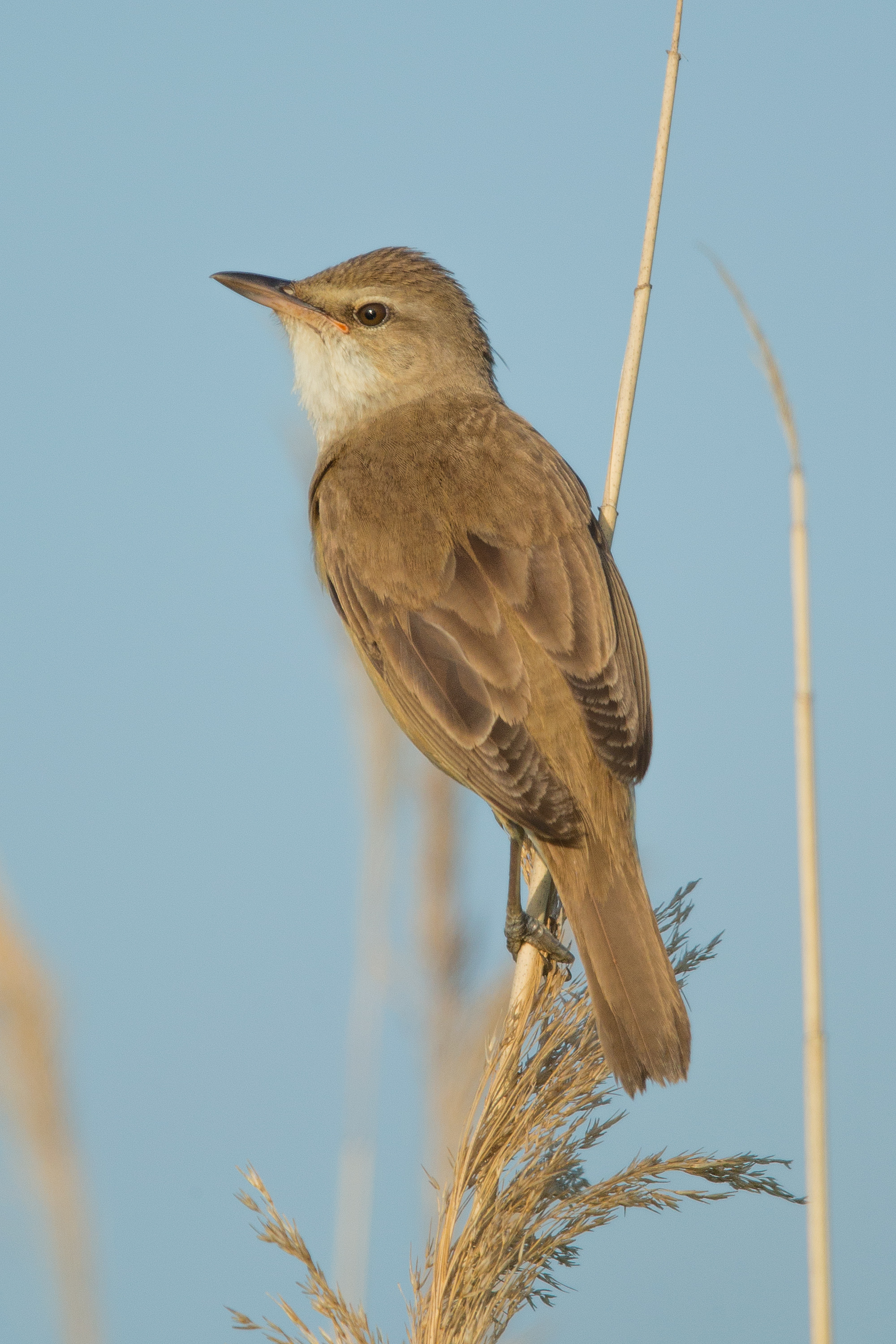
- Adult at a bird banding station

Conservation status
- Least Concern (IUCN 3.1)

Scientific classification
- Kingdom: Animalia
- Phylum: Chordata
- Class: Aves
- Order: Passeriformes
- Family: Acrocephalidae
- Genus: Acrocephalus
- Species: A. arundinaceus

Binomial name
- Acrocephalus arundinaceus (Linnaeus, 1758)
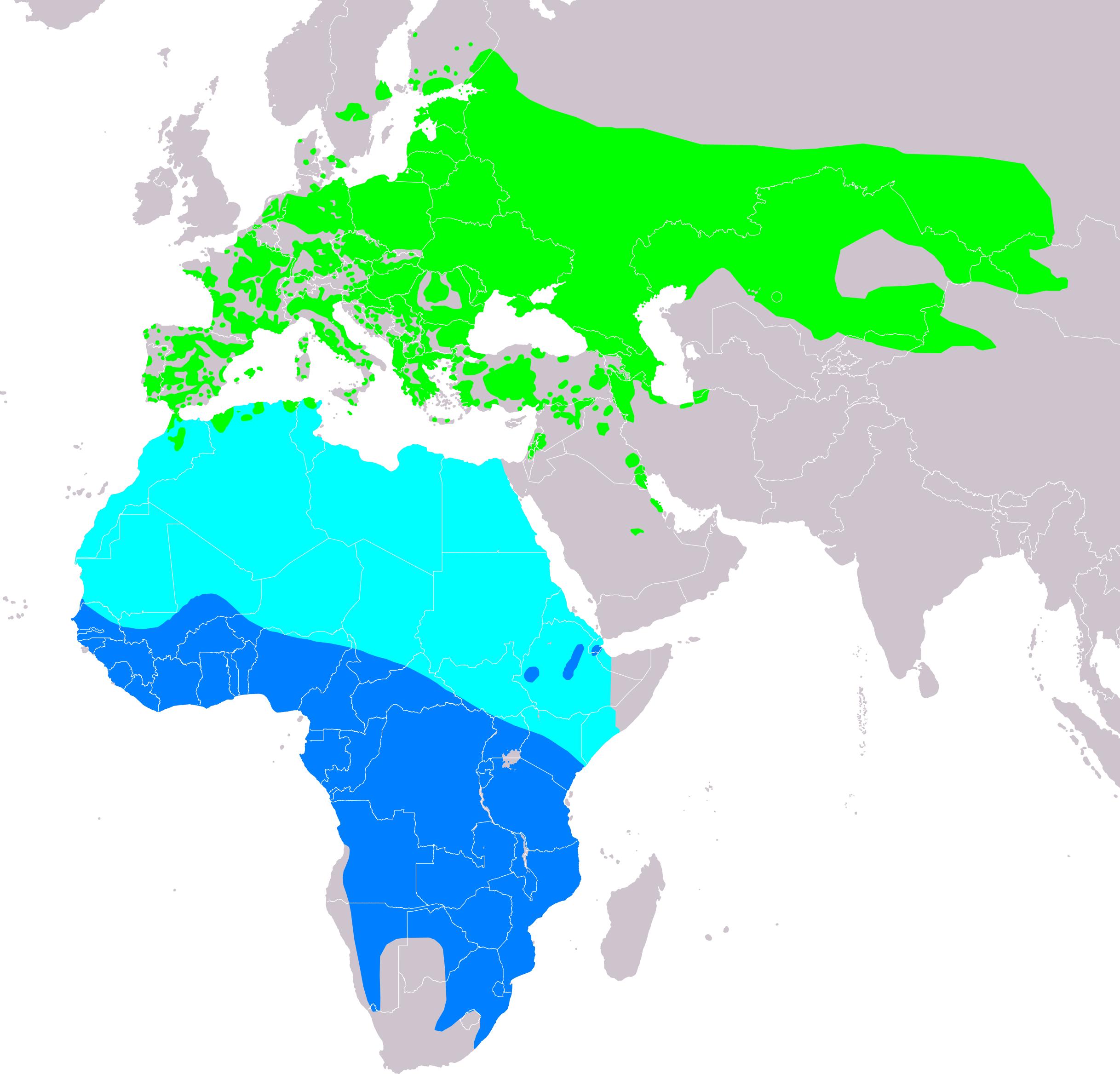
- Range of A. arundinaceus Breeding Passage Non-breeding

Synonyms
- Turdus arundinaceus Linnaeus, 1758; Acrocephalus turdoïdes

= Great reed warbler =

Eurasian bird

The great reed warbler (Acrocephalus arundinaceus) is an insectivorous bird in the family Acrocephalidae. It is a medium-sized passerine bird and the largest of the warblers. It breeds throughout mainland Europe and the Western Palearctic and migrates to sub-Saharan Africa in the winter. It favours reed beds during the breeding season, while living in reed beds, bush thickets, rice fields, and forest clearings during the winter. It exhibits relatively low sexual dimorphism, and the sexes are similar in appearance. This species mates both polygynously and monogamously.

== Taxonomy ==
The great reed warbler was formally described in 1758 by the Swedish naturalist Carl Linnaeus in the tenth edition of his Systema Naturae. He placed it with the thrushes in the genus Turdus and coined the binomial name Turdus arundinaceus. He specified the type locality as Northern Europe. Linnaeus based his entry on the Turdus musicus palustris or Bruch Beiden Rohr Drossel that had been described in 1750 by the German naturalist Jacob Theodor Klein in his book Historiae avium prodromus. The specific epithet arundinaceus is Latin meaning "like a reed" (hence "of the reeds"), from arundo, arundinis meaning "reed". The great reed warbler is now one of 42 species placed in the genus Acrocephalus that was introduced in 1811 by the German naturalist Johann Andreas Naumann and his son Johann Friedrich Naumann.

Two subspecies are recognised:

- A. a. arundinaceus (Linnaeus, 1758) – Europe to north Iran and northwest Arabia
- A. a. zarudnyi Hartert, EJO, 1907 – southeast European Russia and north Iran to northwest Mongolia and northwest China

== Description ==
The thrush-sized warbler is one of the largest species in both its current the family Acrocephalidae, and its former family, the "Sylviidae". It measures 16–21 cm (6.3–8.3 in) in length, 25 to 30 cm (9.8 to 11.8 in) in wingspan and weighs 22 to 38 g (0.78 to 1.34 oz). The adult has unstreaked brown upperparts and dull buffish-white chin and underparts. The forehead is flattened, and the bill is strong and pointed. It looks very much like a giant common reed warbler (Acrocephalus scirpaceus), but with a stronger supercilium. The sexes are identical, as with most old world warblers, but young birds are richer buff below.

The warbler's song is very loud and far-carrying. The song's main phrase is a chattering and croaking carr-carr-cree-cree-cree-jet-jet, to which the whistles and vocal mimicry typical of marsh warblers are added.

== Distribution and habitat ==
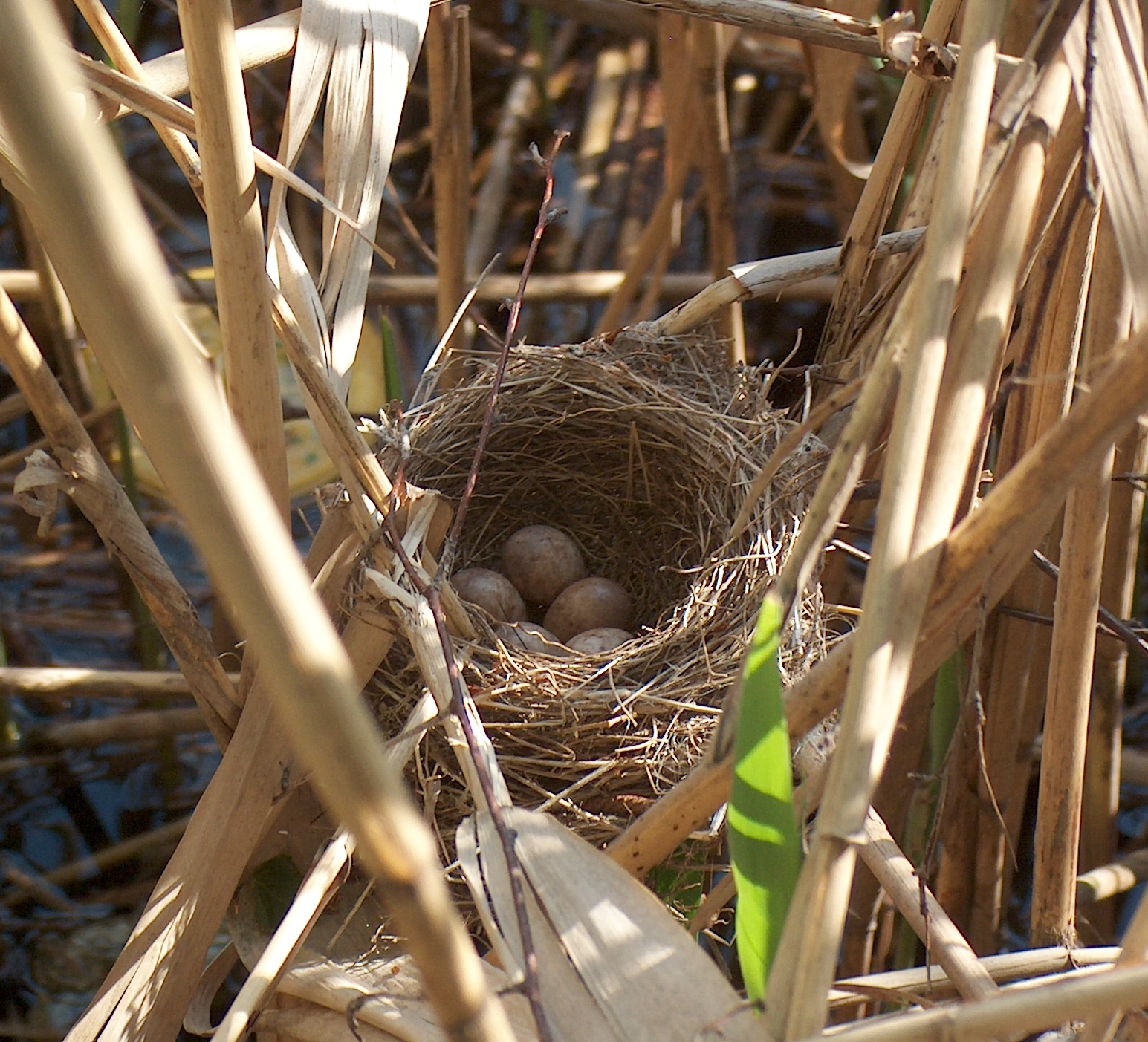
Nest with clutch of eggs

The great reed warbler breeds in Europe and the west Palearctic. It does not breed in Great Britain, where only the closely related, smaller common reed warbler Acrocephalus scirpaceus occurs, but is an irregular visitor. Its population has in recent decades increased around the eastern Baltic Sea, while it has become rarer at the western end of its range. It is a migratory bird, wintering in tropical Africa. It migrates north at a rather late date, and some birds remain in their winter quarters until the end of April.

The mtDNA haplotype data indicate that during the last glacial period there were two allopatric populations of great reed warbler. The great reed warblers in southwestern and southeastern Europe were at that time apparently separated by the Vistulian-Würm ice sheets and the surrounding barren lands. Though the data are insufficient to infer a date for this separation robustly, it suggests the populations became separated around 80,000 years ago, coincident with the first major advance of the ice sheets. The populations must have expanded their range again at the start of the Holocene about 13,000 years ago, but even today the western birds winter in the west and the eastern birds in the east of tropical Africa.

During 2017–2019, miniature data loggers were used to track migratory flights of great reed warblers, over the Mediterranean Sea and Sahara Desert, between their breeding grounds at Lake Kvismaren, Sweden, and their winter quarters in sub-Saharan Africa. When over the Sahara Desert, some birds would ascend to altitudes exceeding 5,000 m (to a maximum 6,267 m); as of 2023, these are the highest recorded passerine ascents. For comparison, such altitudes are higher than those of the summits of the highest mountains in Africa and Europe. Possible explanations for such high-altitude ascents include avoidance of predation, reduction of risk of hyperthermia and dehydration, and extension of the visual horizon.

This passerine bird is found in large reed beds, often with some bushes. On their breeding grounds, they are territorial. In their winter quarters, they are frequently found in large groups, and may occupy a reed bed to the exclusion of other birds. Like most warblers, it is insectivorous, but it will take other prey items of small size, including vertebrates such as tadpoles.

The great reed warbler undergoes marked long-term population fluctuations, and it is able to expand its range quickly when new habitat becomes available. This common and widespread bird is considered a species of least concern by the IUCN. Population size can be calculated with a suitability model, but direct counts of territorial males in suitable habitat and sampling the population sex-ratio can be a proper alternative to inference-rich predictive modeling based on imperfect habitat-extrapolation of densities of reed warblers at large spatial scales.

Population densities of Great reed warblers (mean±SD) in European countries
Country	Method	Pairs/ha	Birds/ha	Nests/ha	Ref.
Spain	Transect	-	1.4	-	
Slovakia	Nest	6.5±6.2	-	-	
Poland	Nest	-	-	2.5±1.8	

== Behaviour ==
=== Diet ===
The great reed warbler has a primarily carnivorous diet. Observation of prey collection specifically during breeding season has shown the retrieval of insect larvae, moths, dragonflies, damselflies, beetles, spiders, small fish, and frogs. It has also been reported to eat fruit during non-breeding seasons. Nestlings typically feed on diptera and arachnids, though this may not be their preferred food.

=== Communication and courtship ===
Song, recorded at Diaccia Botrona marsh (Italy)

Song, recorded at Macta marsh (Algeria)

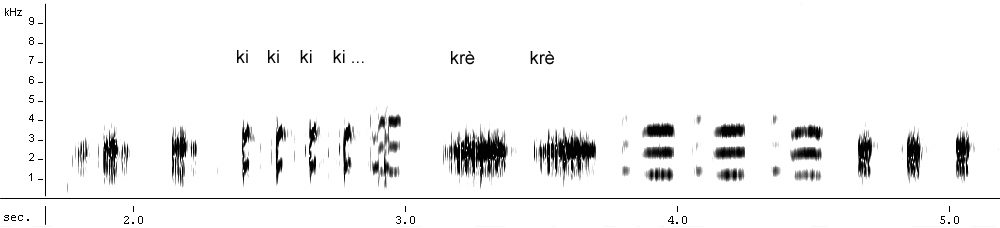
Sonogram of a great reed warbler's song, recorded at Macta marsh (Algeria)

Great reed warbler (Kyiv, Ukraine)

Male great reed warblers have been observed to communicate via two basic song types: short songs about one second in length with few syllables, and long songs of about four seconds that have more syllables and are louder than the short variety. It has been observed that long songs are primarily used by males to attract females; long songs are only given spontaneously by unpaired males, and cease with the arrival of a female. Short songs, however, are primarily used in territorial encounters with rival males.

During experimental observation, male great reed warblers showed reluctance to approach recordings of short songs, and when lured in by long songs, would retreat when playback was switched to short songs.

Traditionally, monogamous species of genus Acrocephalus use long, variable, and complex songs to attract mates, whereas polygynous varieties use short, simple, stereotypical songs for territorial defence. There is evidence that long songs have been evolved through intersexual selection, whereas short songs have been evolved through intrasexual selection. The great reed warbler is a notable example of these selective pressures, as it is a partial polygynist and has evolved variable song structure (both long and short) through evolutionary compromise.

In addition to communication, the great reed warbler's song size has been implicated in organism fitness and reproductive success. Though no direct relationship has been found between song size and either territory size or beneficial male qualities, such as wing length, weight, or age, strong correlation has been observed between repertoire size and territory quality. Furthermore, partial correlation analysis has shown that territory quality has significant effect on the number of females obtained, while repertoire length is linked to the number of young produced.

=== Mating system and sexual behaviour ===
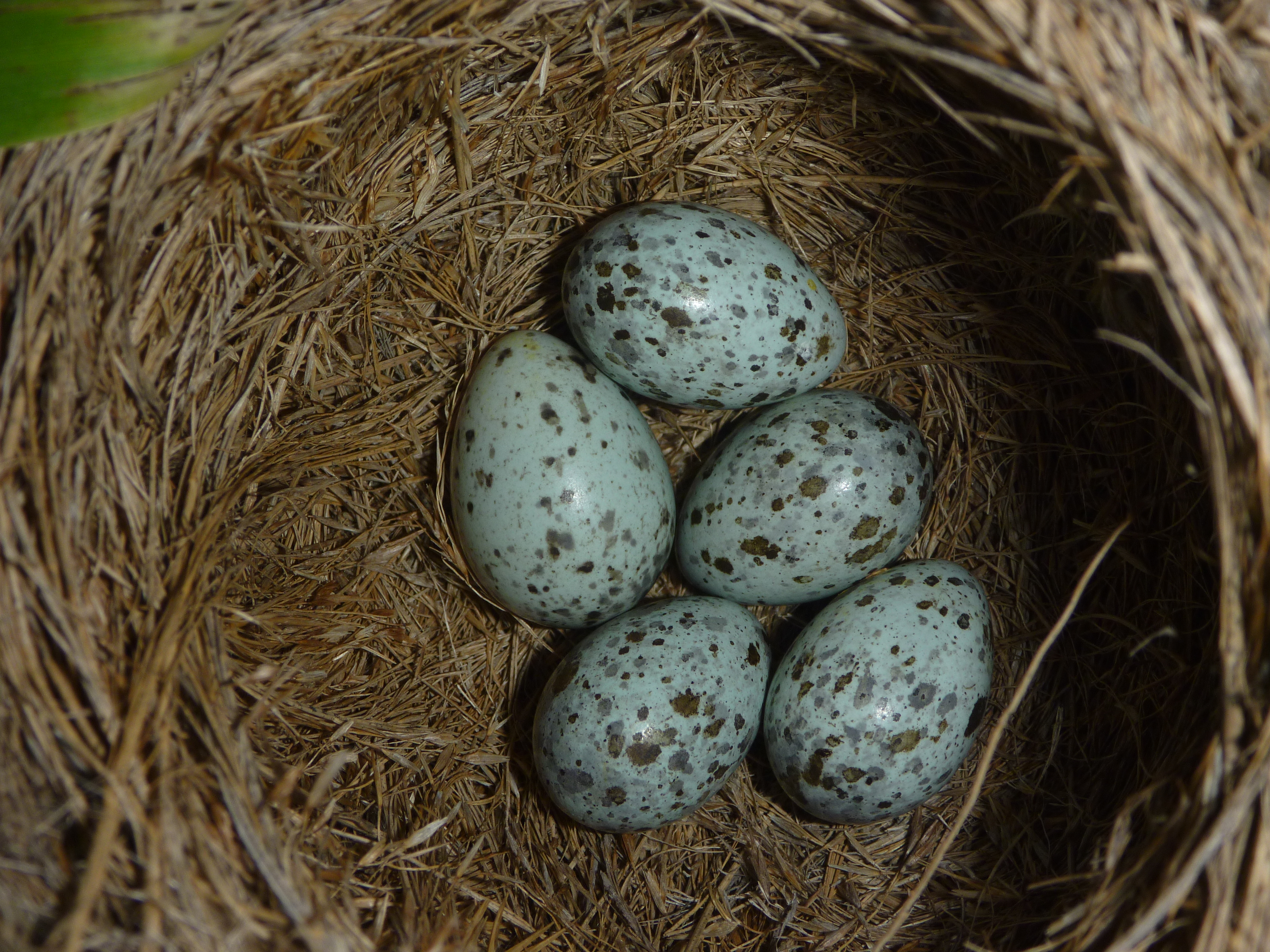
Nest containing a slightly larger common cuckoo egg and four warbler eggs (Apaj, Hungary)

Great reed warbler females lay 3–6 eggs in an open cup-nest in reeds. Some pairs of warblers are monogamous, but others are not, and unpaired, so-called "satellite" males still father some young. Great reed warblers defend their nests using graded alarm calls, directed towards a wide range of enemies, although these alarm calls might reveal the whereabouts of the nest to brood parasites.

A long-term study of the factors that contribute to male fitness examined the characteristics of males and territories in relation to annual and lifetime breeding success. It showed that the arrival order of the male was the most significant factor for predicting pairing success, fledgling success, and number of offspring that survive. It also found that arrival order was closely correlated with territory attractiveness rank. Females seem to prefer early arriving males that occupy more attractive territories. These females also tend to gain direct benefits through the increased production of fledglings and offspring that become adults. In addition, male song repertoire length is positively correlated to annual harem size and overall lifetime production of offspring that survive. Song repertoire size alone is able to predict male lifetime number of surviving offspring. Females tend to be attracted to males with longer song repertoires since they tend to sire offspring with improved viability. In doing so, they gain indirect benefits for their own young.

Great reed warblers have a short, polygynous breeding cycle in which the male contributes little to parental care. They defend large territories in reed beds where there is reduced visibility, which may allow males to practice deception by moving and attracting a second female. This second female may not realise that the male has already mated. Polygyny of the great reed warbler was assessed in another study that showed the importance of female choice. The differences in territory characteristics seemed to be more important. However, there is also a strong correlation between males and their territory characteristics. Models based on the polygyny threshold and sexy son hypotheses predict that females should gain evolutionary advantage in either short-term or long-term in this mating system, yet the study did not support this. The data showed that secondary females had greatly reduced breeding success.
