= List of rivers of Algeria =

This is a list of rivers in Algeria. This list is arranged west to east by drainage basin, with respective tributaries indented under each larger stream's name.

== Atlantic Ocean ==
- Draa River

== Mediterranean Sea ==
- Al-Hamiz Valley
- Tafna River
  - Isser River
- Hammam River (Habra River) (Macta River)
  - Sig River
  - Mebtouh River
- Chelif River
  - Mina River
  - Djediouia River
  - Ghiou River (Riou River)
  - Sly River
  - Tsighaout River
  - Fodda River
  - Rouina River (Zeddine River)
  - Ebda River
  - Massine River
  - Deurdeur River
  - Akoum River
  - Nahr Ouassel River
  - Touil River
- Mazafran River
- Harrach River
- Reghaïa River
- Boudouaou River
- Boumerdès Valley
- Isser River
  - Malah River
- Meraldene River
- Sebaou River
- Soummam River
  - Amassine River
  - Bou Sellam River
  - Sahel River
- Kebîr River (Jijel)
  - Enndja River
  - Rummel River
- Guebli River
- Safsâf River
- Kebir River (Skikda)
- Seybouse River
  - Cherf River
- Kebîr River (El Taref)
- Medjerda River
  - Mellègue River
    - Ksob River (Chabro)
    - Meskiana River

== Sahara ==
=== Sebkhet el Melah ===
- Oued Saoura
  - Oued Zousfana
  - Oued Guir
    - Oued Béchar
- Oued Messaoud
  - Oued Tilia

=== Chott Ech Chergui ===
- Oued el Korima

=== Chott el Hodna ===
- Oued Leham

=== Chott Melrhir ===
- Oued Djedi
- Oued Zeribet
  - Oued el Arab
- Oued el Mitta
- Oued Ittel
- Oued el Kherouf

=== Sebkhet Safioune ===
- Oued Zegrir
- Oued Mya

=== Sebkha Mekerrhane ===
- Oued Tsaret
- Asouf Mellene
- Oued Tasendjanet

=== Ahaggar ===
- Oued Igharghar
- Oued Tafassasset
- Oued Ti-n-Tarabine
- Oued Igharghar
- Oued Zazir
- Oued Ti-n-Amzi
- Oued Tamanrasset

=== Grand Erg Occidental ===
- Oued Namous
