= Boukacem =

Boukacem is a surname. Notable people with the surname include:

- Boualem Boukacem (born 1957), Algerian artist
