= Azela, Boumerdès =

Azela
- Motto: العزلة
- Interactive map of Azela
- Commune: Beni Amrane
- District: Thénia District
- Province: Boumerdès Province
- Region: Kabylie
- Country: Algeria Algeria

Area
  - Total: 5 km^{2} (1.9 sq mi)

Dimensions
  - Length: 2.5 km (1.6 mi)
  - Width: 2 km (1.2 mi)
- Elevation: 400 m (1,300 ft)
- Time zone: UTC+01:00
- Area code: 35006

Azela is a village in the Boumerdès Province in Kabylie, Algeria.

== Location ==
The village is surrounded by Meraldene River and the town of Thenia in the Khachna mountain range.

== Notable people ==
- Boualem Boukacem (born 1957), Algerian artist.
- Mohamed Hassaïne (1945-1994), Algerian journalist.
