= Mountains of Daïa =

Mountain range in western Algeria

The Daïa Mountains or Dhaya mountains are a mountain range of Algeria located in the west of the country and constituting a part of the Tellian Atlas.

It is in the Wilaya of Sidi Bel Abbès.

== Geography ==
The Daïa Mountains are located in Inner Orania, between Saida and Telagh, and form a rugged and wooded relief of holm oaks and Aleppo pines, bordering the steppic plains in the south.

The highest point is Altitude 1 455 m, Djebel Mezioud

The mountains form part of the Tellian Atlas and are located between the mountains of Tlemcen and the mounts of Saida. Most of them correspond to the forest massif of Telagh and are oriented south-west / north-east. The altitudes range from 1,300 to 1,400 meters.
