= Sig River =

Watercourse in Algeria

The Sig River, also known as Mekerra, is a river of Algeria.

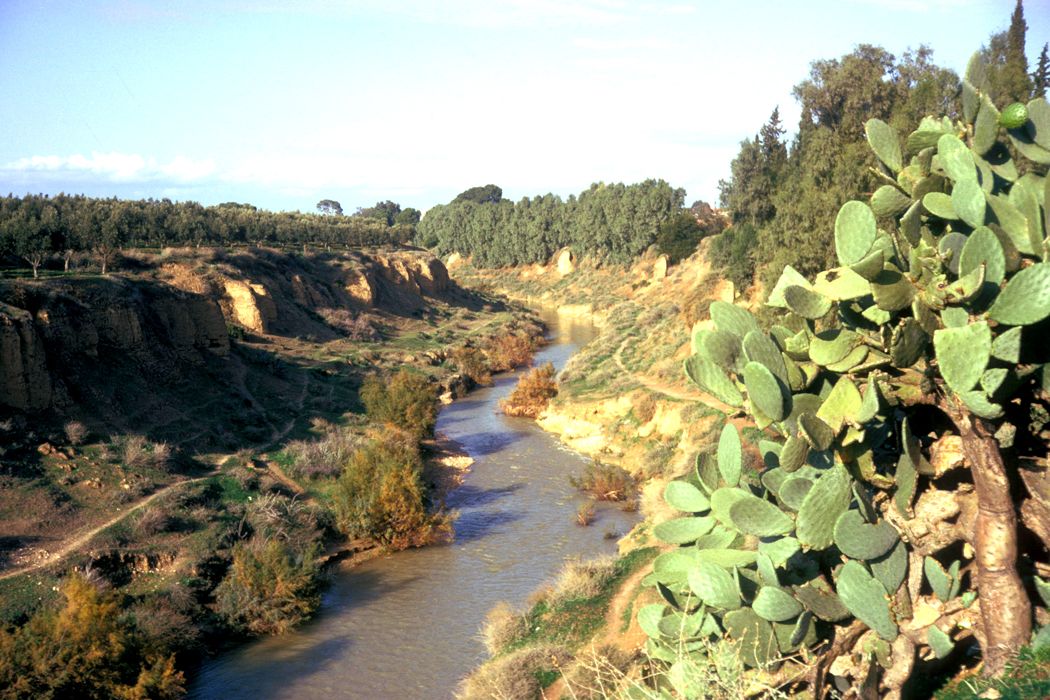
Oued Sig in 1975

The Sig River is a tributary of the Macta River and flows through the town of Sig. For most of its flow the Sig is at 50 metres (160 ft) elevation and ends about 30 kilometres (19 mi) from the Mediterranean as the crow flies, and originates in the highlands south of the mountains of Daïa. The river is a wadi.

The area is characterized by a rough winter compared to other regions in Algeria, and a fairly warm summer. Rainfall does not exceed 400 millimetres (16 in) per year.
