= Beni Khelifa =

- Nickname: Aït Khelifa
- Motto: بني خليفة - آيت خليفة
- Interactive map of Beni Khelifa
- Commune: Beni Amrane
- District: Thénia District
- Province: Boumerdès Province
- Region: Kabylie
- Country: Algeria Algeria

Area
  - Total: 3 km^{2} (1.2 sq mi)

Dimensions
  - Length: 1.5 km (0.93 mi)
  - Width: 2 km (1.2 mi)
- Elevation: 440 m (1,440 ft)
- Time zone: UTC+01:00
- Area code: 35006

Beni Khelifa or Aït Khelifa is a village in the Boumerdès Province in Kabylie, Algeria.

== Location ==
The village is surrounded by Meraldene River, Isser River and Boumerdès River and the towns of Beni Amrane and Thénia in the Khachna mountain range.
