= Boumerdès Valley =

Valley in Boumerdès, Algeria

Boumerdes Valley
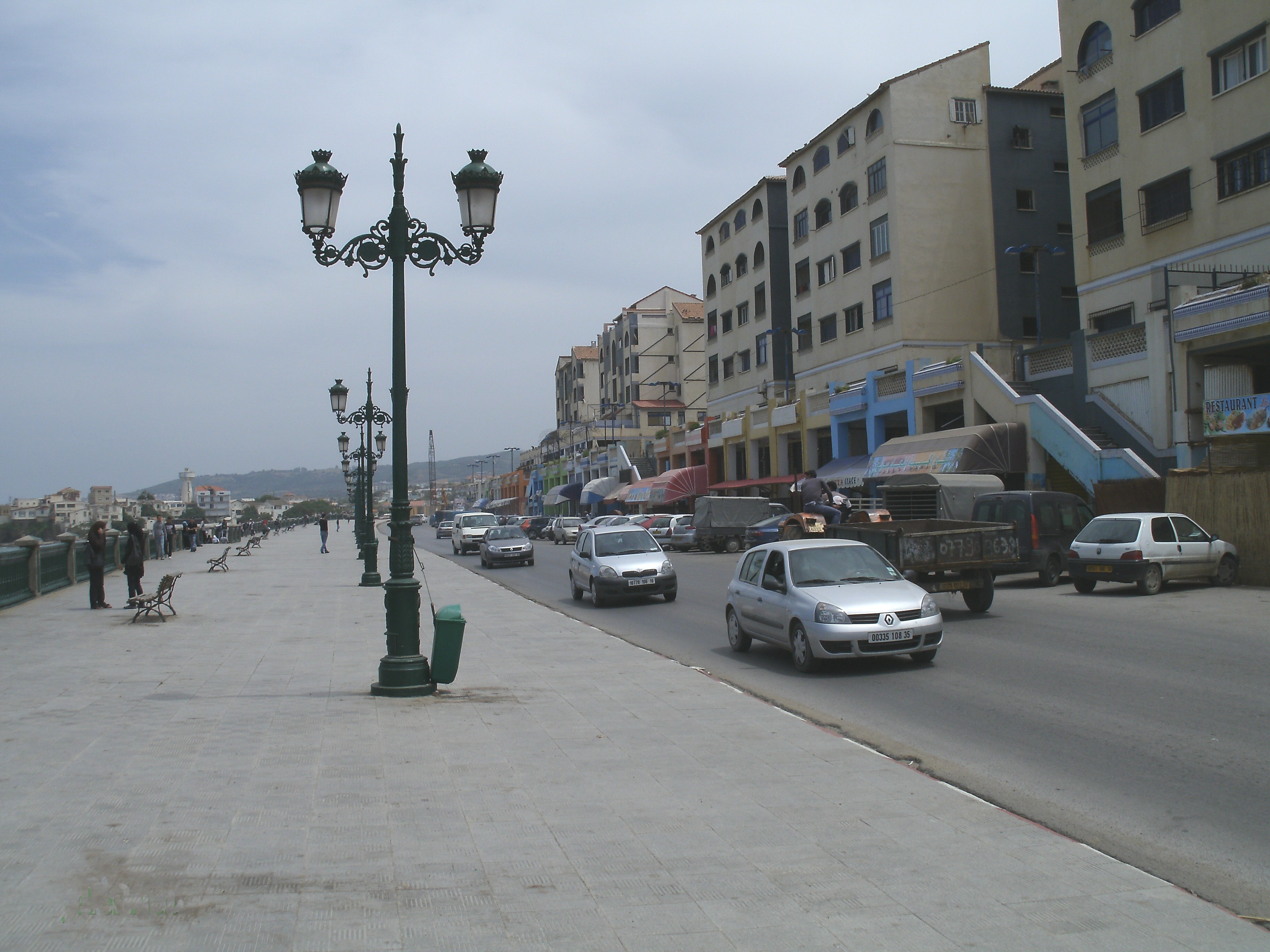
- Boumerdas valley, east of Boumerdas city

Location
- Country: Algeria

Physical characteristics
- Source: Tell Atlas, Khachna, Boumerdès Province
  - elevation: 624 m (2,047 ft; 341 fathoms), Boumerdès Province, Beni Amrane
- 2nd source: Tell Atlas, Boumerdès Province
  - elevation: 583 m (1,913 ft; 319 fathoms), Boumerdès Province, Tidjelabine
- Source confluence: Boumerdès Province
  - elevation: 45 m (148 ft; 25 fathoms), Thénia
- Mouth: Boumerdès Province, Boumerdès
  - elevation: 5 m (16 ft; 2.7 fathoms), Mediterranean Sea
- Length: 10 km (6.2 mi)
- Basin size: 1,200 km^{2} (460 sq mi), Drainage basin

Basin features
- Landmarks: Algeria, Boumerdès Province, Beni Amrane, Tidjelabine, Thénia, Boumerdès

Boumerdes Valley is a watercourse that originates in the Khachna Mountains and flows through the Kabylia region, passing through Boumerdès Province and into the Mediterranean Sea near the city of Boumerdès.

== Watercourse ==
Boumerdes Valley is characterized by a riverbed free from schist and clay materials. This feature, which it shares with other rivers such as Arbia Valley, Meraldene River, Boudouaou Valley, and Isser River, facilitates the extraction of sand and gravel for use in mortar and concrete production.

The riverbed of Boumerdès Valley serves as a natural corridor, with a width ranging from 5 to 600 meters. It descends gradually from its confluence with Meraldene River and Arbia Valley in the municipality of Thénia Beni Aicha, near Mount Bouarous in the south, flowing towards its mouth in the Mediterranean Sea to the east of Boumerdès city.

This moderate slope enabled the construction of the Thenia Beni Aicha Dam in 1913. During the rainy season, water flow increases, prompting the construction of bridges and pathways to facilitate the movement of residents in the villages and neighborhoods along its banks.

== The path ==
Boumerdes Valley flows through a single coastal province in Algeria, traversing the Khachna Mountains.

Municipalities in Boumerdès governorate on the "Boumerdes Valley" path
Number	Boumerdès Province
01	Beni Amrane
02	Tidjelabine
03	Thénia
04	Boumerdès

== Valleys ==
Boumerdes Valley intersects with several other streams and rivers along its course within Boumerdès Province.

Valleys along the "Boumerdes Valley" path
Number	Boumerdès Province
01	Borden Valley
02	Wadi Arabia
03	Meraldene River
04	Bovron Valley

== Dams ==
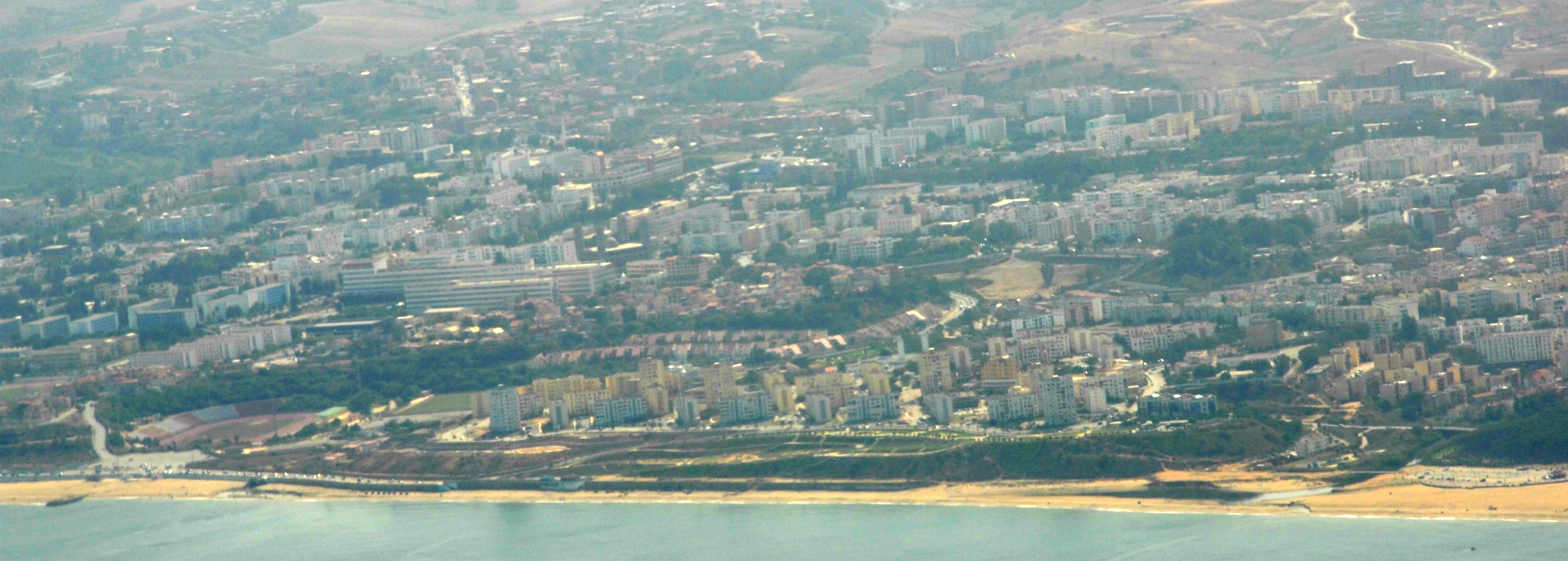
The mouth of the Boumerdès Valley into the Mediterranean Sea

Boumerdès Valley passes through several dams along its course in Boumerdès Province.

Dams in the path of the "Boumerdes Valley"
Number	Boumerdès Province
01	Meraldene Dam

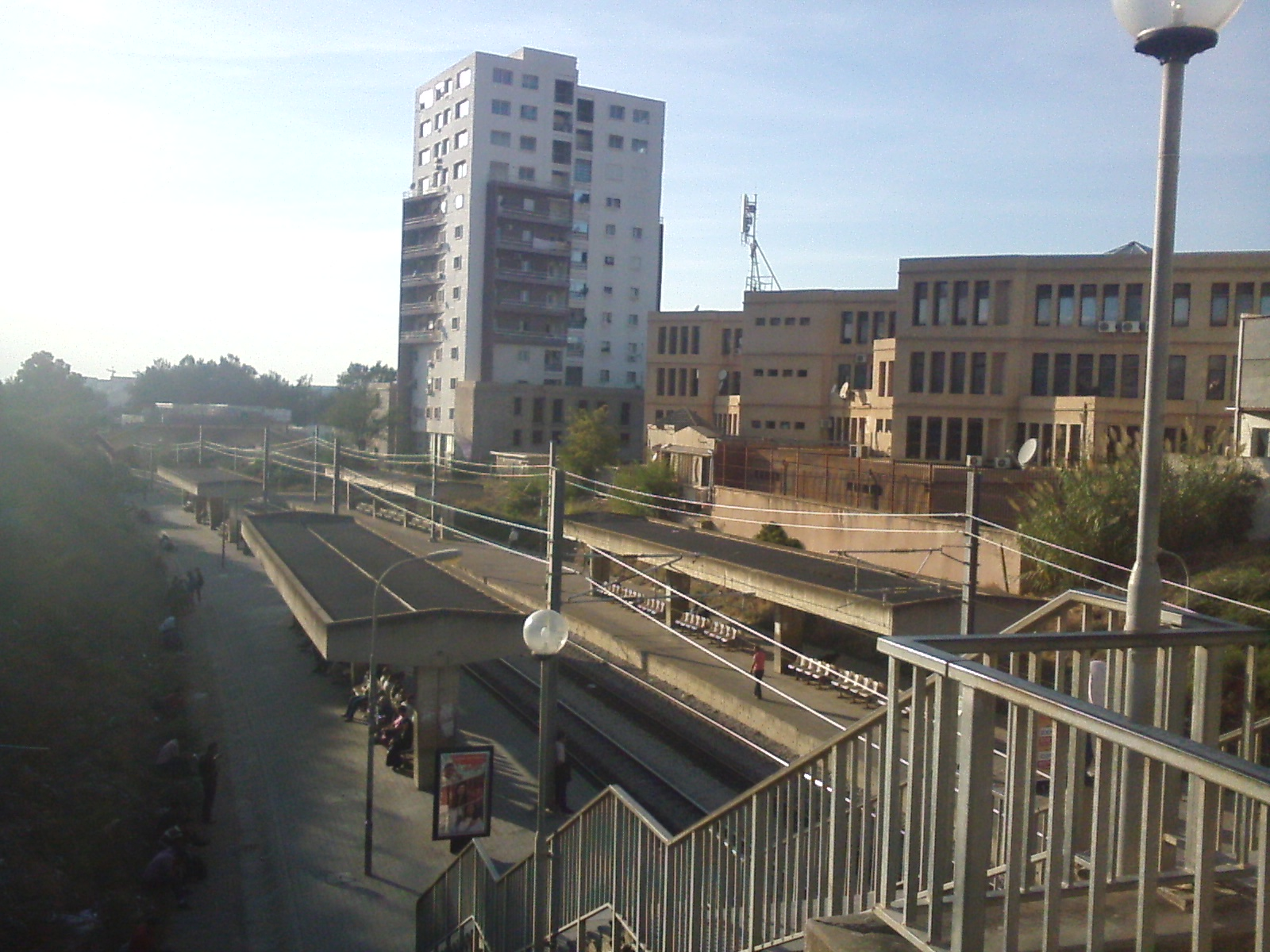
Boumerdès train station

== National roads ==
Boumerdès Valley intersects with several national roads along its course.

National roads in the path of the "Boumerdès Valley"
Number	Boumerdès Province
01	National Road No.5
02	National Road No.24

== Gallery ==
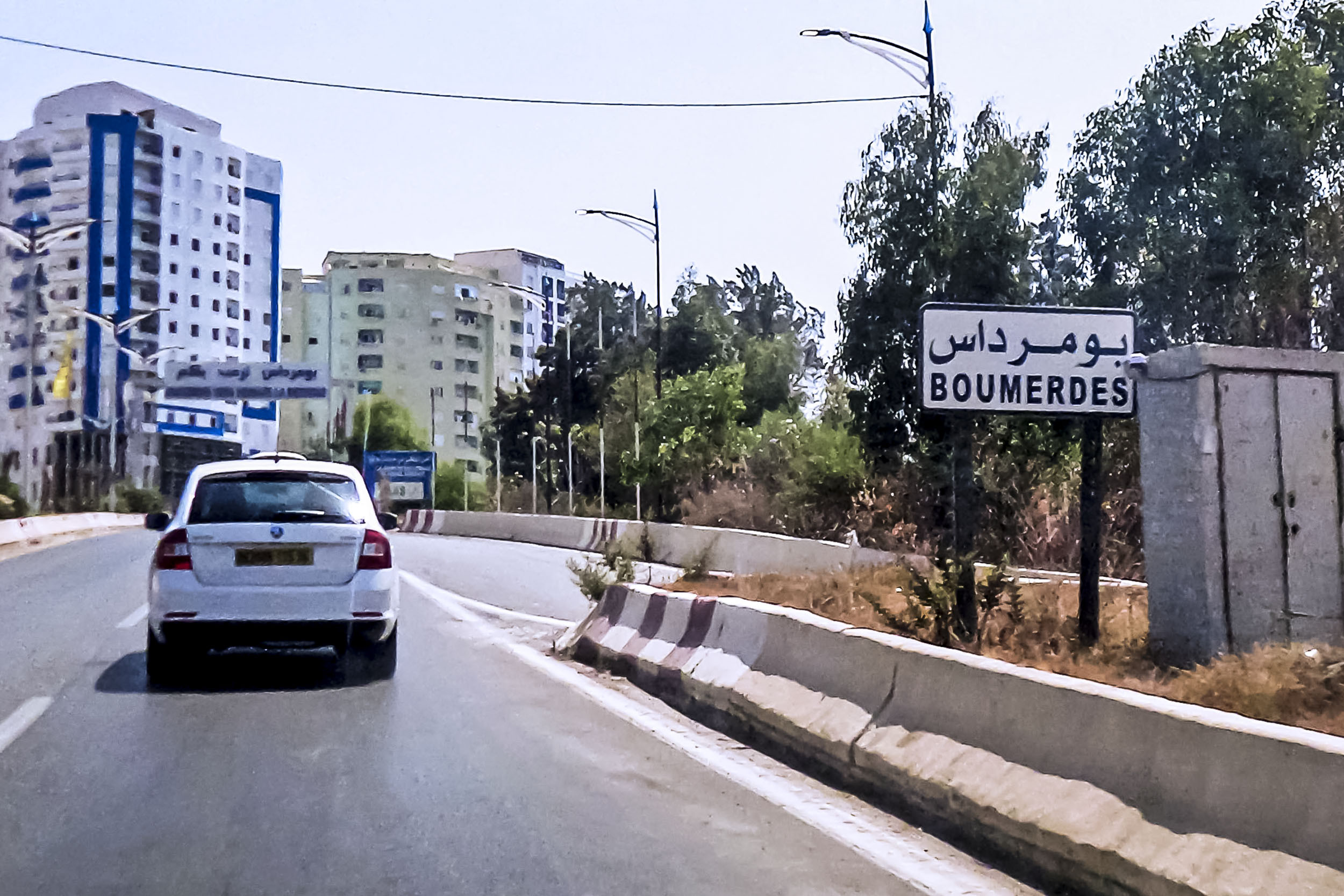
Boumerdes

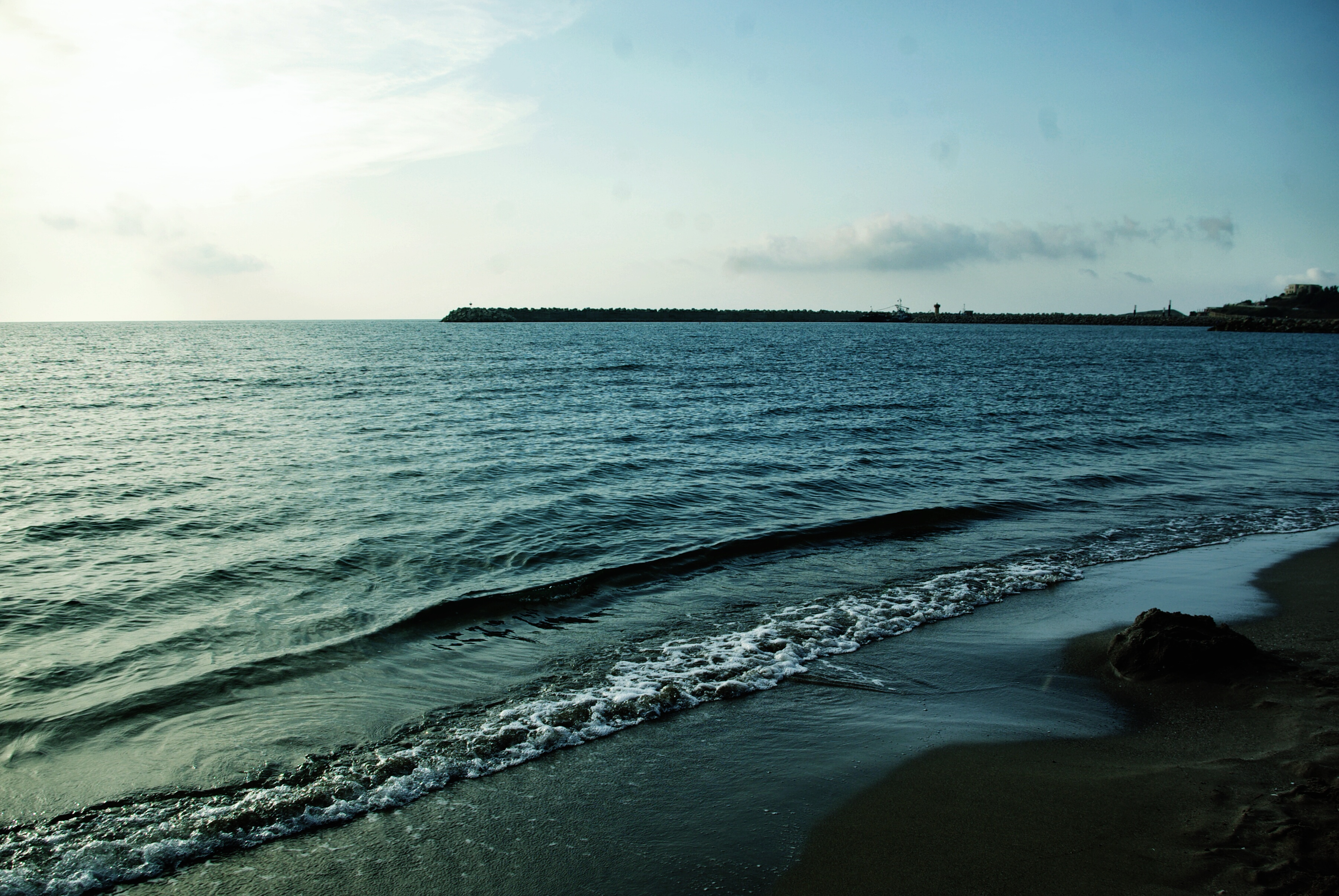
The mouth of the Boumerdès Valley, east of Boumerdès city

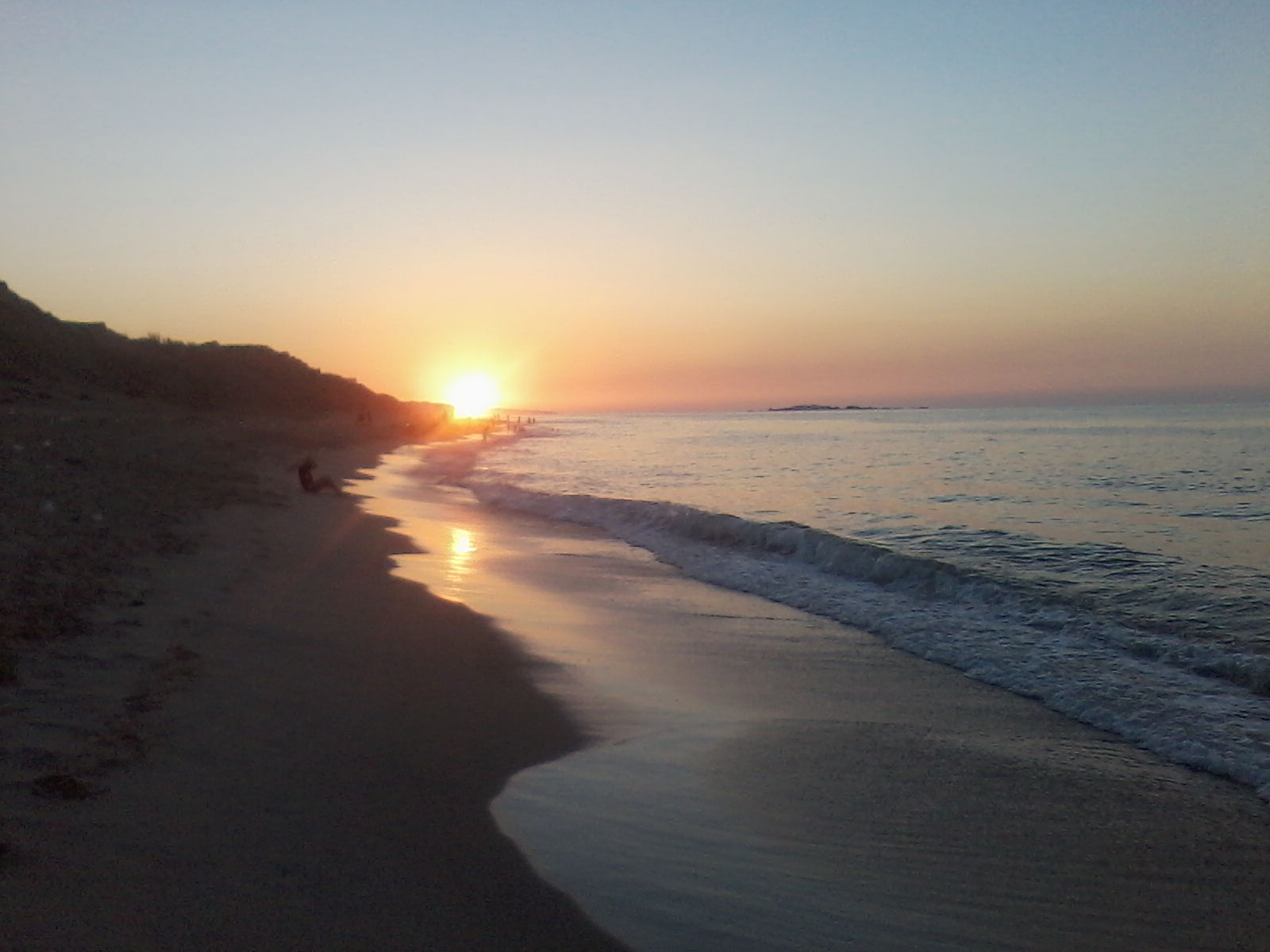
The mouth of the Boumerdès Valley, east of Boumerdès city

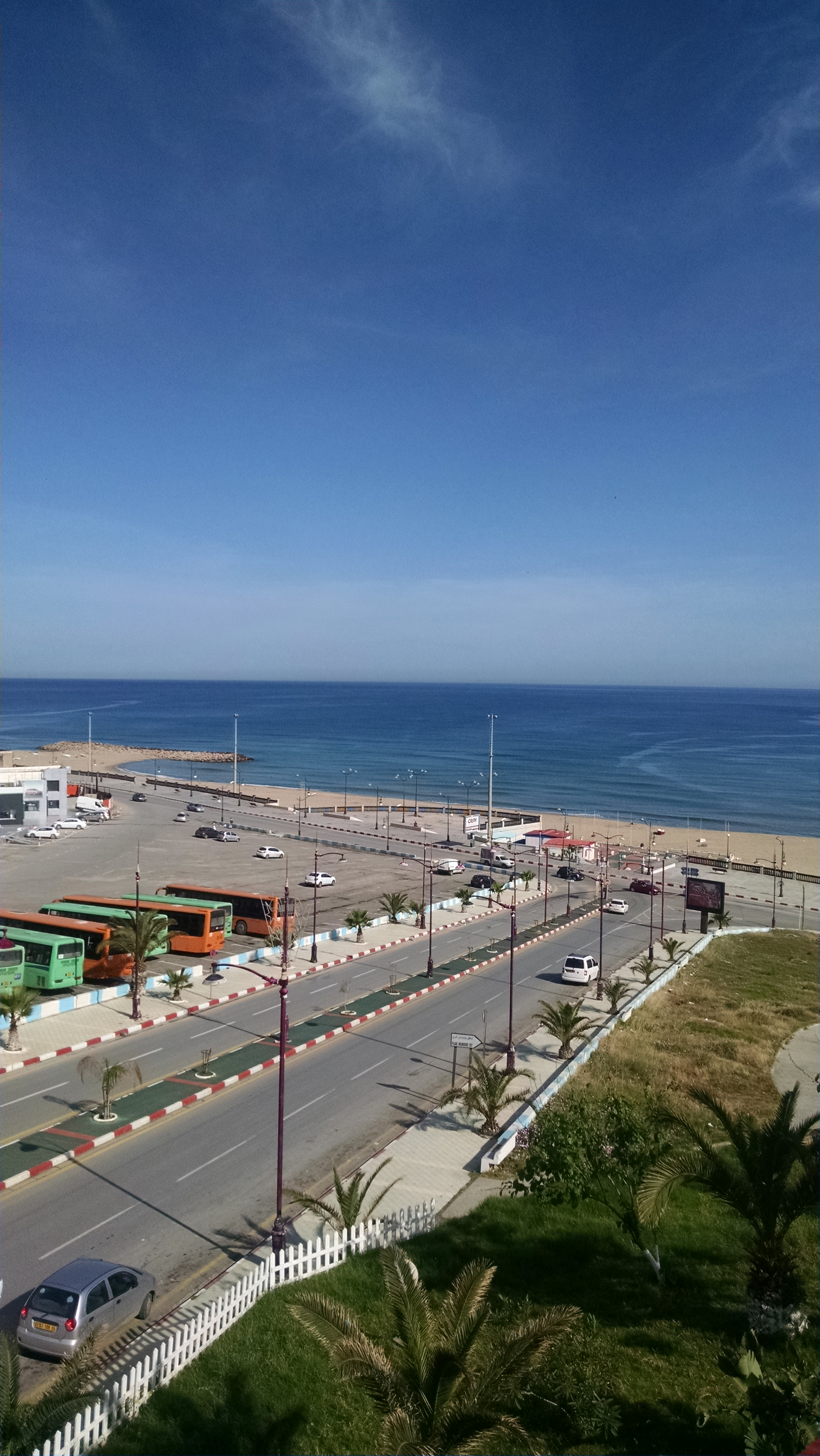
The mouth of the Boumerdès Valley, east of Boumerdès city
