= Mebtouh River =

Town and river in Algeria

The Oued Mebtouh is a river and the name of a town in the Département d'Oran, Algeria. The river is a tributary of the Macta River.
