= Meraldene Dam =

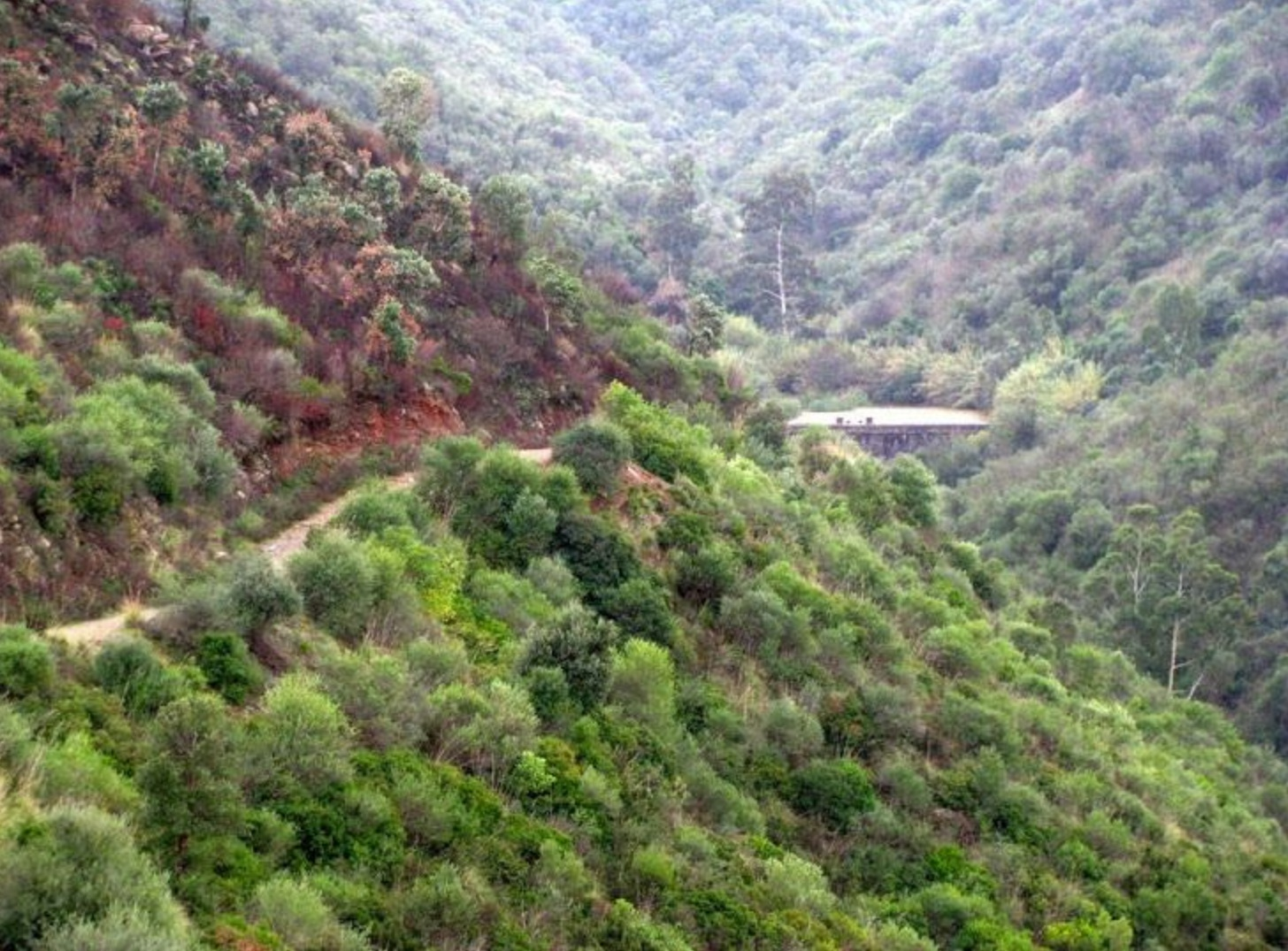
- Meraldene Dam
- Interactive map of Meraldene Dam
- Official name: Barrage Meraldene
- Country: Algeria
- Location: Meraldene, Thénia, Boumerdès Province, Kabylia
- Coordinates: 36.7126657°N 3.5469341°E
- Construction began: 24 May 2011
- Opening date: 26 February 1913
- Built by: Auguste Schneider
- Designed by: Henri Chauzy

Dam and spillways
- Type of dam: Embankment, rock-fill clay core
- Impounds: Meraldene River

The Meraldene Dam, or Barrage Meraldene, is an embankment dam on the Meraldene River, located at 3 km (2 mi) southwest of Thénia in Boumerdès Province within Kabylia in Algeria.

== Construction ==
The design of this project was entrusted to the engineer-architect, Henri Chauzy, who had his office in Algiers.

The project for the realization of this hydraulic structure was approved on 24 May 1911 in order to carry out the water supply of the Meraldene River as well as the construction of the dam itself.

Auguste Schneider, a contractor based in Thénia at the time, carried out the work on this dam until its final acceptance. The dam was approved for use on 26 February 1913 by the city of Thénia and its railway station.

Indeed, this city created in 1872 required for its growth and economic development that there be a significant supply of fresh water, often difficult to achieve through wells and natural water sources.

== Description ==
The construction of the Tizi N’Aït Aïcha Dam began on 24 May 1911, and was completed in two years, with operations commencing on 26 February 1913.

The reservoir, also known as Mahran Dam, had an initial storage capacity of 15,000,000 cubic meters (approximately 19,619,259 cubic yards) before sedimentation reduced its capacity over time.

The Bourdin Dam supported the nearby Tizi N’Aït Aïcha Train Station by supplying water through a pumping system.

This dam functions as a water reservoir, receiving its supply from streams originating in several nearby villages, including Thabrahimth, Meghladen, Keddara, Soumaâ, and Tizouighine.

Meghladen River collects runoff from these villages, feeding into the dam. Excess water not retained by the dam flows into the Arabia River, which runs through the city of Thénia, and subsequently into the Boumerdès River, which empties into the Mediterranean Sea near the city of Boumerdès.

== Water ==
The water stored in Mahran Dam is potable, sourced primarily from the Meraldene River. This river is, in fact, an extension of the larger Bourdin River, which originates from the Debagha area in the highlands of Beni Amrane Municipality.

The stored water is notable for its low concentration of suspended solids, with a mass concentration of less than 2 grams per liter. This quality contributes to the suitability of the dam's water for drinking and other uses.

== Watershed ==
The catchment area supplying Meraldene Dam covers a total of 3,615 square kilometers (1,396 square miles). The region has an average elevation of 750 meters (0.466 miles).

The average annual rainfall in this watershed is approximately 790 millimeters (31 inches), contributing to its water resources. The average water flow in the Meraldene River, which serves this catchment area, is 5.8 cubic meters per second (7.6 cubic yards per second).

The Crop Factor, which measures runoff potential, has an average value ranging between 150 and 300, reflecting moderate to high water retention and flow dynamics within the area.

== Borden Valley Water Fetching ==
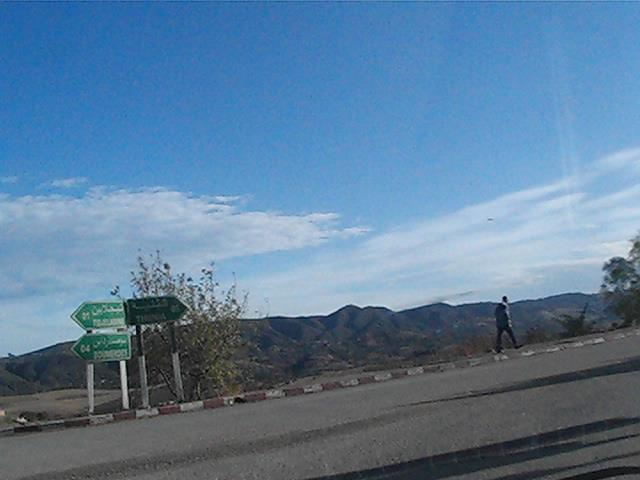
Khachna mountains around Tizi Nayeth Aicha

Water is supplied to Mahran Dam from the main watercourse, the Bourdin River. The decision to construct the dam in 1911 was part of an effort to develop the settlement of Thénia to accommodate an increasing number of European workers employed on the railway. This followed the establishment of the Minerville Settlement (French: Ménerville) in 1872.

The mayor of Thénia at the time, Philippe Jalabert, announced the tender for the dam project, inviting contractors to submit bids between 30 April 1911, and 24 May 1911. Files for the project proposals were received by the civil engineering expert M. Chauzy at the municipal offices, with additional submissions processed at the provincial offices in Algiers.

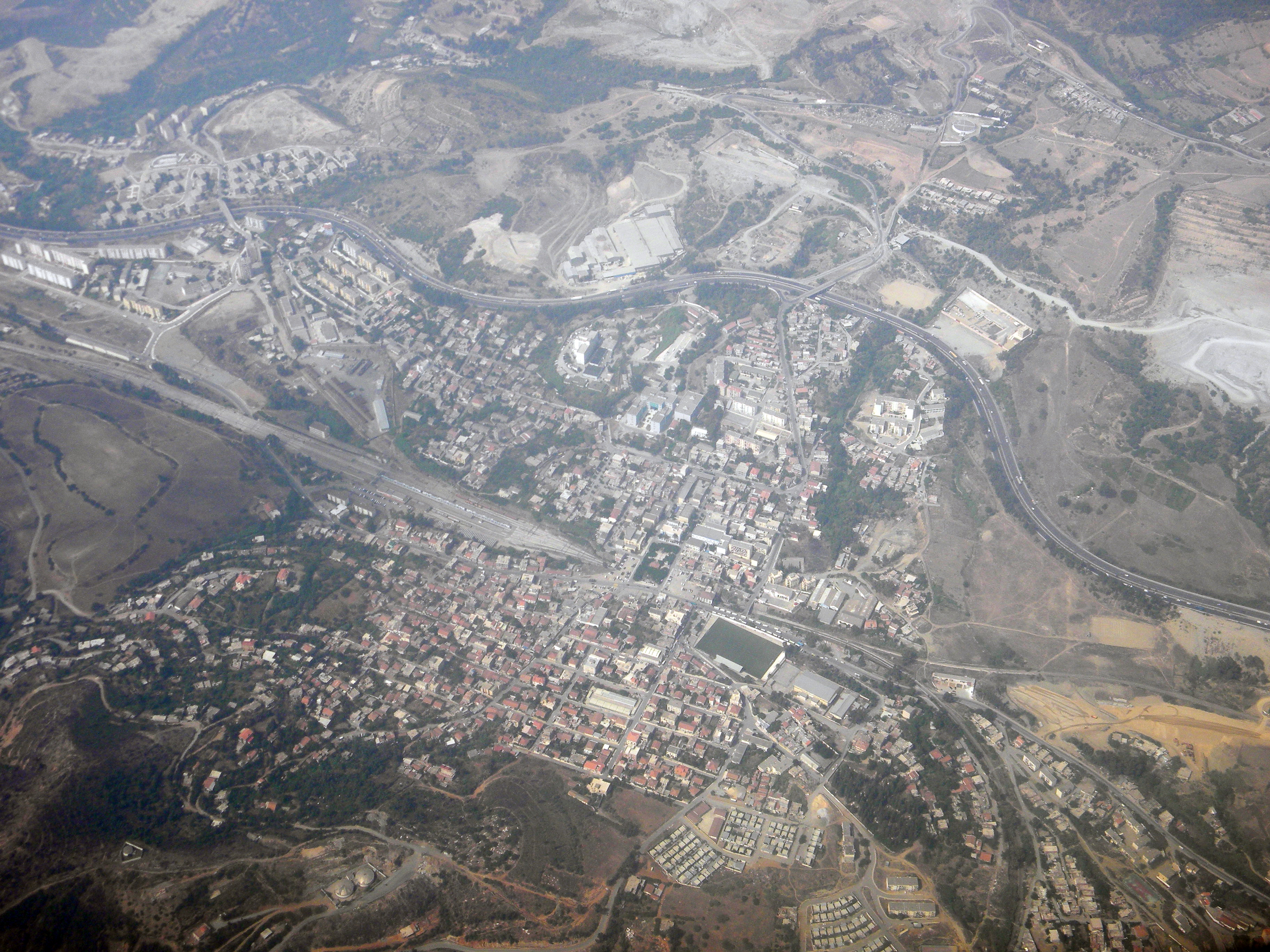
Aerial photography of Tizi Nayeth Aicha

The tender documents were opened at 3:00 PM on 24 May 1911, in the deliberation hall of the Thénia municipal building. In a public session, municipal officials awarded the project for water supply from the Bourdin River through a bidding process to one of the contractors.

The budget for the water supply project was as follows:

- 23,218.30 French francs for construction by the contracting company.
- 9,781.70 French francs for completion costs.
- 33,000.00 French francs as the total project cost.
- 1,000.00 French francs as a deposit and guarantee for the project.

This project marked a critical step in enhancing water infrastructure in Thénia and supporting its expansion during the colonial period.

== Parts of the Mahran Dam Project ==
The construction of Mahran Dam involved three main components:

1. Building the Dam Structure.
2. Constructing a Spillway with a Concrete Channel.
3. Establishing a Valve Control Room.

== Specifications ==
Location of Thenia Municipality in Boumerdas Governorate

Meraldene Dam is a water reservoir designed as a crowned arch structure situated along the course of the Bourdin River, which extends into the Meraldene River in the municipality of Thénia Beni Aïcha.

- Length: The dam measures 68 meters (223 feet).
- Width: It has a width of 3.25 meters (10.66 feet).
- Height: The dam rises 13.26 meters (43.50 feet) above the riverbed of the Meraldene River on its southern side, facing Meraldene village.
- Base Thickness: The foundation thickness is 7.50 meters (24.61 feet) at the riverbank level.
- Storage Capacity: Before sedimentation, the dam could store up to 30,000 cubic meters (39,239 cubic yards) of water.

== Oversight of the Meraldene Dam Project ==
People's Municipal Assembly of Thénia Beni Aïcha was responsible for overseeing the progress of the Meghladen Dam project, beginning in 1911.

By 1 September 1912, progress had been achieved, as evidenced by the approval of reports submitted by the supervising civil engineer.

The engineering firms led by Auguste Schneider and Fratissier participated in a municipal meeting to finalize the project's overall budget. These collaborative efforts ensured the project's steady advancement and compliance with the planned timeline.

== Establishment of the Mahran Dam ==
The town of Thénia Beni Aïcha was established in 1872 by the French colonial administration following the suppression of the Mokrani Revolution. The European settlers, primarily from Alsace and Lauren, faced challenges in securing potable water supplies.

While the indigenous inhabitants of the Aït Aïcha tribe relied on rivers, streams, springs, and traditional wells for their water needs, the European settlers needed a more robust water infrastructure to sustain their presence in the plains opposite the Khachna Mountains.

The Meraldene Dam, inaugurated on 26 February 1913, marked a pivotal moment in the consolidation of European settlement in the Kabylie region. Its construction laid the groundwork for future water projects, including the Chaâbet El Akhra Dam (1945), the Ighzer Oufetiss Dam (1950), and the Ighil Amda Dam (1953).

The inauguration ceremony for the dam on the Meghladen River was attended by the town's mayor, the supervising engineer M. Chauzy, and the contractor Auguste Schneider, underscoring its importance to the colonial infrastructure.

== Purpose of the Mahran Dam ==
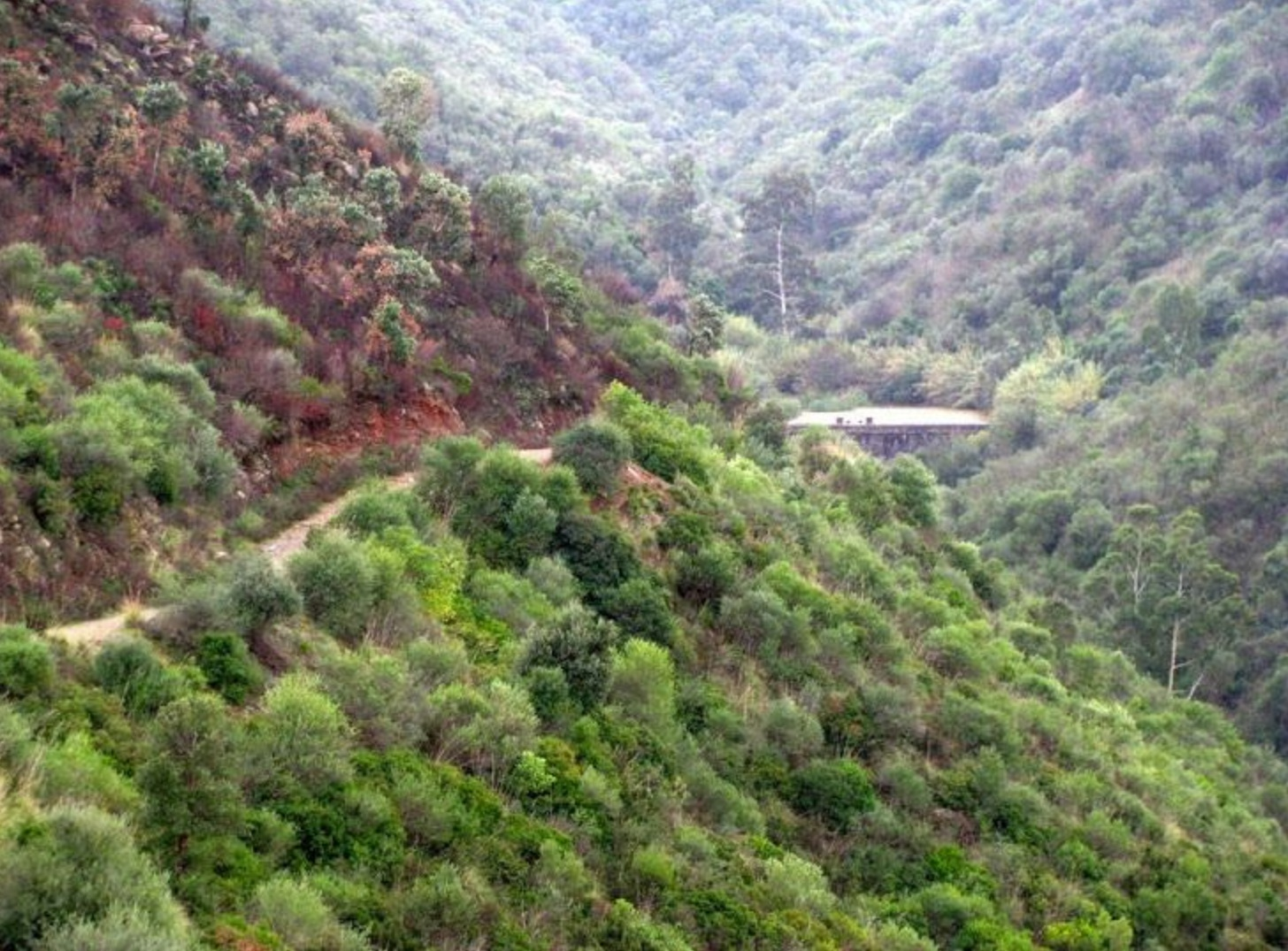
Merreddine Dam, Morabitine Dam, Thenia, Kabylia Region

Upon its inauguration in 1913, the waters of the Meraldene Dam were designated to supply the railway storage facilities and workshops at the Thénia train station, in addition to direct pumping from the Meraldene River, located approximately 300 meters south of the dam's basin.

This infrastructure development facilitated the establishment of artisan and industrial workshops in the town of Thénia, which was equipped with electricity and water supplies. These advancements enabled local residents to integrate into urban society as workers, artisans, and inhabitants, particularly in the aftermath of World War I, marking a shift towards a more urbanized and industrialized community.

=== Purpose and Historical Context of the Mahrane Dam ===
Mahrane Dam was constructed with the objective of supplying water to trains traveling towards Tizi Ouzou and Constantine, particularly at the Thénia train station, as part of the route originating in Algiers.

The dam's location was originally a small pond known as "Drink and Escape", due to the presence of wildlife such as Barbary lion, hyenas, and other predators that frequented the site to drink.

The name "Mahrane" has its roots in the Amazigh language, derived from "Aman n Wihran", which translates to "the water of lions". Over time, the name was colloquially shortened to "Mahrane", a name that was later adopted by the neighboring Mahrane village, reflecting its historical association as the "Lake of Lions."

== Location ==
The "Mahran Dam" is located not far from the coastal strip of Boumerdes Province, approximately 20 kilometers south of Zemmouri Port, 4 kilometers west of the Boudouaou Dam, and 9 kilometers southeast of Thénia Dam.

This site, situated in the Khachna Mountains overlooking the coastal strip and the seafront, provides a strategic location along National Road No. 5.

The "Mghildane Dam" is located 13 kilometers southeast of the city of Boumerdes, overlooking the Isser River. This dam is near the highlands of the Kabylie region.

== Gallery ==
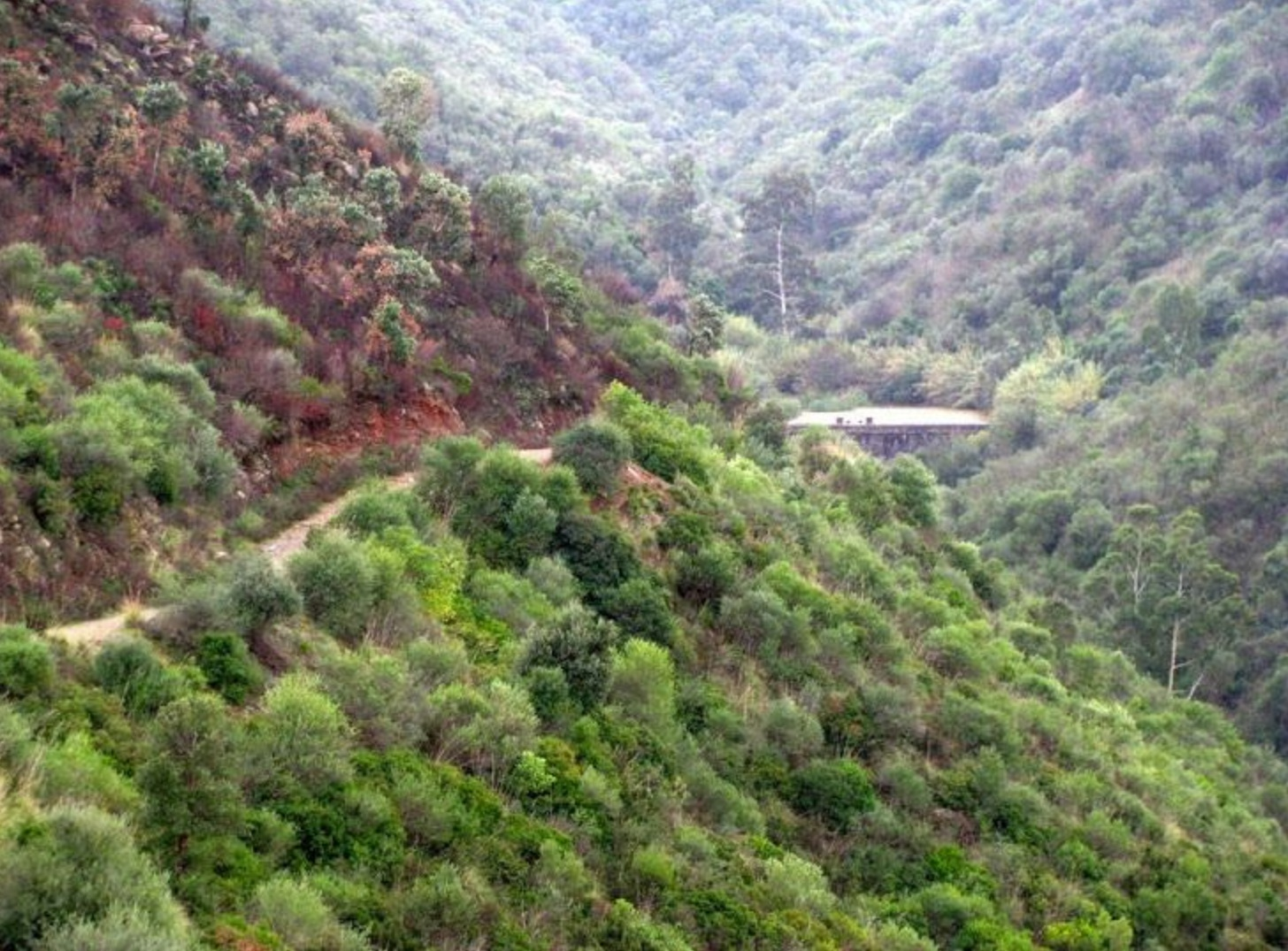
Meraldene Dam

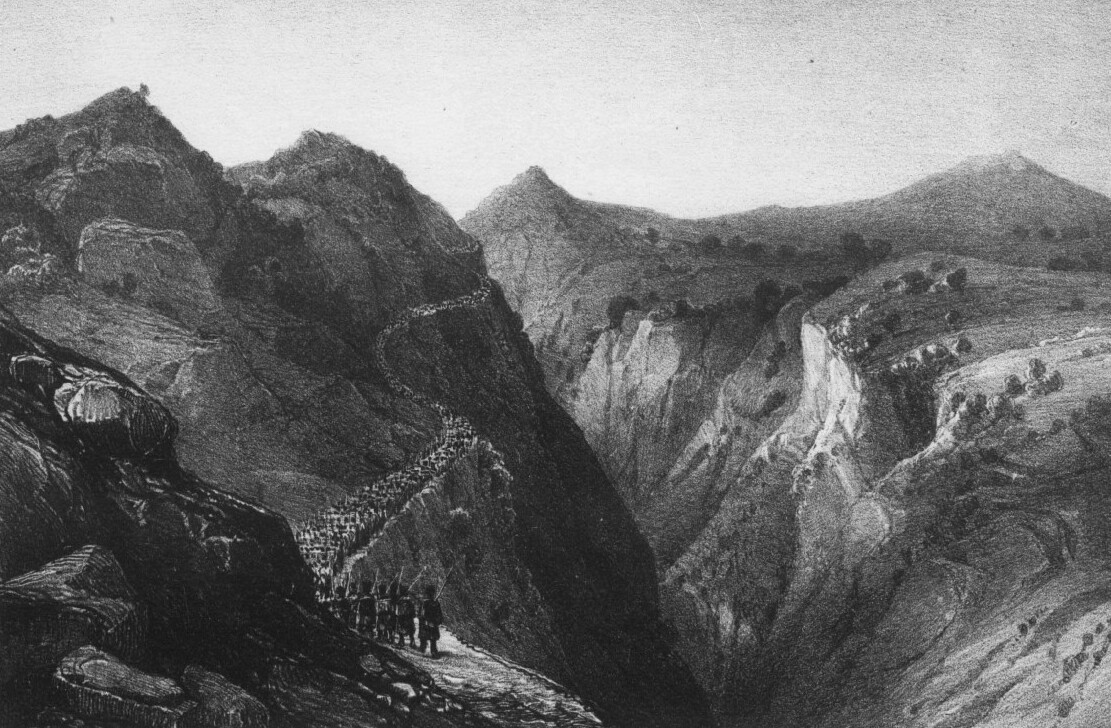
Meraldene Ravine

== See also ==
- List of dams and reservoirs
- List of dams of Algeria
- List of rivers of Algeria
- Meraldene River
