= Boualem Boukacem =

Algerian singer

Boualem Boukacem بوعلام بوقاسم
- Born: Boualem Boukacem; October 12, 1957 (age 68); Beni Amrane, Algeria
- Origin: Berber people
- Genres: Kabyle music, Algerian music
- Occupations: Musician, singer, poet, guitarist
- Instruments: Algerian mandole, Guitar, Violin, Flute, Ney
- Years active: 1978–present

Boualem Boukacem (Arabic: بوعلام بوقاسم), (October 12, 1957, in Beni Amrane) is a singer of Kabyle music within Algerian music.

== Life ==
He was born on October 12, 1957, under the name Boualem Boukacem in the Azela village within the actual Boumerdès Province.

After completing his school studies, he began a teaching career in 1977 in the region of the Col des Beni Aïcha to the east of the Khachna massif in lower Kabylia.

His career as an artist in Kabyle song began in 1978 and was dedicated after the release of his first album on 1981, and he joined between his teaching profession and his vocation as an artist until 1986 when he decided to devote himself entirely to the professional song.

He is a seasoned musician who handles and uses like a virtuoso musical instruments such as the Algerian mandola, the guitar, the ney, the flute and the violin.

During the period of Islamist terrorism in Algeria, Boukacem went into exile in 1992 abroad where he remained for eight years before returning to the Algerian country during the year 2000.

In 2020, the artist Boukacem had produced in his prize list a total of more than 50 sound albums, of which 4 albums were sung by singer Ouardia Aissaoui, and 3 other albums were sung by singer Thanina Cheriet, daughter of the singer Idir.

During more than 40 years of artistic career, Boukacem had to his credit more than 120 clips produced, and animated more than 1000 galas and parties in Algeria and elsewhere, and participated in more than a hundred television programs.

During the 2010 Africa Cup of Nations, Boukacem released an album to encourage the Algeria national football team during the 2010 FIFA World Cup qualification matches at this African sporting event.

This album was released in collaboration with the national goalkeeper Lounès Gaouaoui, and included for the occasion a range of 12 songs to encourage the national green team.

Boukacem has also collaborated during his long career with several other artists in duet songs.

== Discography ==
=== Adjighk Ayaguitar ===
No.	Title	Length
1.	"Ach hal inchdhah"	04:25
2.	"Adjighk ayaguitar"	05:55
3.	"Aka dhalhala ofannan"	04:30
4.	"Akkan kan idigarav walfine"	03:25
5.	"Allah Allah"	04:00
6.	"Allez la JSK"	03:24
7.	"Ayan inatcha"	03:34
8.	"Elligh etswasnagh"	03:44
9.	"Hamlagh"	03:34
10.	"I boussi"	02:33
11.	"Ivadal felli el hal"	04:48
12.	"Nafrah zaama"	03:25
13.	"Navdha n khadam thizlathin"	04:10
14.	"Savhanzk aya khllag"	03:46
15.	"Sliyid adhamdhkough"	06:28
16.	"Yatswg zem ofaggag nachna"	04:54

=== Sannouva ===
No.	Title	Length
1.	"Sannouva"	04:49
2.	"Assadats alawlia"	05:29
3.	"Da kaci"	04:31
4.	"Ahya djamila"	04:51
5.	"Thoudhrine"	04:50
6.	"Ghas aaddan wossan dhlasnin"	05:22
7.	"Ahya loukan"	05:03
8.	"Aya aassas imaghvan"	03:58
9.	"Algérie mon beau pays"	04:19
10.	"Algérie foot"	04:28
11.	"Instrumental sannouva"	04:53
12.	"Instrumental algérie"	04:27

=== Balako Chfaya Taa Wled Faraoun ===
No.	Title	Length
1.	"Balako Chfaya Taa Wled Faraoun"
2.	"Beznes Beznes"
3.	"Da Mouh"
4.	"Arraw Nfaraoun"
5.	"Ahya Hiti"
6.	"Hadhar Athaqvailith"
7.	"Addan Wossan Oghilif"
8.	"Athahninthiw Ayama"
9.	"Ya Mthimi"
10.	"Gollagh"
11.	"Hadrath Chfaya"

=== Algerien TV ===
No.	Title	Length
1.	"Arraw anfaraoun"	04:20
2.	"Assa dhal farhis"	03:03
3.	"Farhamthas iyamas"	05:10
4.	"Haqlag assagui noussad"	03:15
5.	"Inimthas adias"	03:40
6.	"Lavar fellak -athkachmagh"	03:52
7.	"Le qad oughanim"	05:06
8.	"Thaghrathin athollas"	04:22
9.	"Thayriw thamazwarout"	04:23
10.	"Yathin mozin lasswar"	03:54

=== Thimahramth Ellahrir ===
No.	Title	Length
1.	"Thaghrvith"	04:15
2.	"Thimahramth Elahrir"	05:20
3.	"Tharwi Dhakhassar"	06:02
4.	"Ayahlili"	03:39
5.	"Athadjazairith"	04:14
6.	"Yawidh Ihamlan Elfan"	04:17
7.	"Ya Sidh Ayouv"	04:12
8.	"Yama Yama"	04:17
9.	"Sfadh Imatawinom"	04:47
10.	"Sahmouth Ourar"	04:37

=== Tharwi Thabbarwi ===
No.	Title	Length
1.	"Tharwi Thabarwi"	05:04
2.	"Athamorthiw"	04:53
3.	"Ouh Alaoqal"	04:51
4.	"Yarrad Ennahtha Woliw"	04:43
5.	"Ayavahri Ellavhar"	04:32
6.	"Voudgham Lahlakiw"	04:47

=== Sahmouth Ourar ===
No.	Title	Length
1.	"Sahmouth Ourar"	05:21
2.	"Yathin Mozin Lasswar"	04:35
3.	"Arriyid Ami"	00:04
4.	"Rouh Ayahviv Rouh"	06:18
5.	"Dhachouth Wayag'ui"	05:14
6.	"Thadjidhad Dhg'ui Siwa Aglim"	06:19

=== Lakhadma La Masrouf ===
No.	Title	Length
1.	"Lakhadma La Masrouf"
2.	"Alhausim"
3.	"Cabhar"
4.	"Ah Mouthas"
5.	"Cheikh Azali"
6.	"Alward Imnaouar"

=== Arraoui Anfaraoun (First version) ===
No.	Title	Length
1.	"Tssariw Athedaragh"
2.	"Arrawa N'Faraoun"
3.	"Azawali"
4.	"Thadzayrith"
5.	"Ruhiw Amthefkagh"
6.	"Anidhakem"

=== Araoui Anfaroun (Second version) ===
No.	Title	Length
1.	"Araoui Anfaroun"
2.	"Atsariw"
3.	"Azawali"
4.	"Arrohiw"
5.	"Thagharvith"
6.	"Anidhakam"

=== Arrayiw ===
No.	Title	Length
1.	"Anidh 'Thallidh"
2.	"Sidhi Ayouv"
3.	"Amrahva"
4.	"Yawidh Ihamlan El Fan"
5.	"Arrayiw"
6.	"Lallas Nthollas"

=== Mahroga ===
No.	Title	Length
1.	"Thaghzalthiw"
2.	"El Baggar"
3.	"Yal Thikalth"
4.	"Awin Ornassin"
5.	"Et'Sasrih"
6.	"Mahroga"

=== Thimahremth Ellahrir (Original version) ===
No.	Title	Length
1.	"Thimahremth Ellahrir"
2.	"Thihdayine"
3.	"Urtusiy'Thara"
4.	"Sfadh Imattawnim"
5.	"Amlaayun"
6.	"Lemhibam"

=== Inimthas Adas ===
No.	Title	Length
1.	"Inimthas Adas"
2.	"Adjathagh Anaach"
3.	"Fallam Isafhdhasig'na"
4.	"Inimthas Adas (Instrumental)"
5.	"Amatsizyas"
6.	"Yama Yama"
7.	"Achoghar Ayakalwach"

== See also ==
- List of Algerian musicians
- List of Algerians
- Music of Algeria
- Culture of Algeria
