= Mounts of Saida =

The mountains of Saida are a mountain range of Algeria located in the west of the country and constituting a part of the Tellian Atlas.

== Geography ==
The mountains of Saida are situated in the west of Algeria, between Saida and Frenda, and form a rugged and wooded relief of holm oaks and Aleppo pines at the edge of the steppic plains in the south.

Many karst sources originate in this mountain range: Ain Zerga, Ain Tifrit, Ain Soltane and Ain Balloul, as well as many streams: Wadi Tifrit, Wadi Sidi Minmoun and Wadi Said.
