= Sly River =

River in Algeria

Coordinates: 36°05′51″N 1°08′10″E

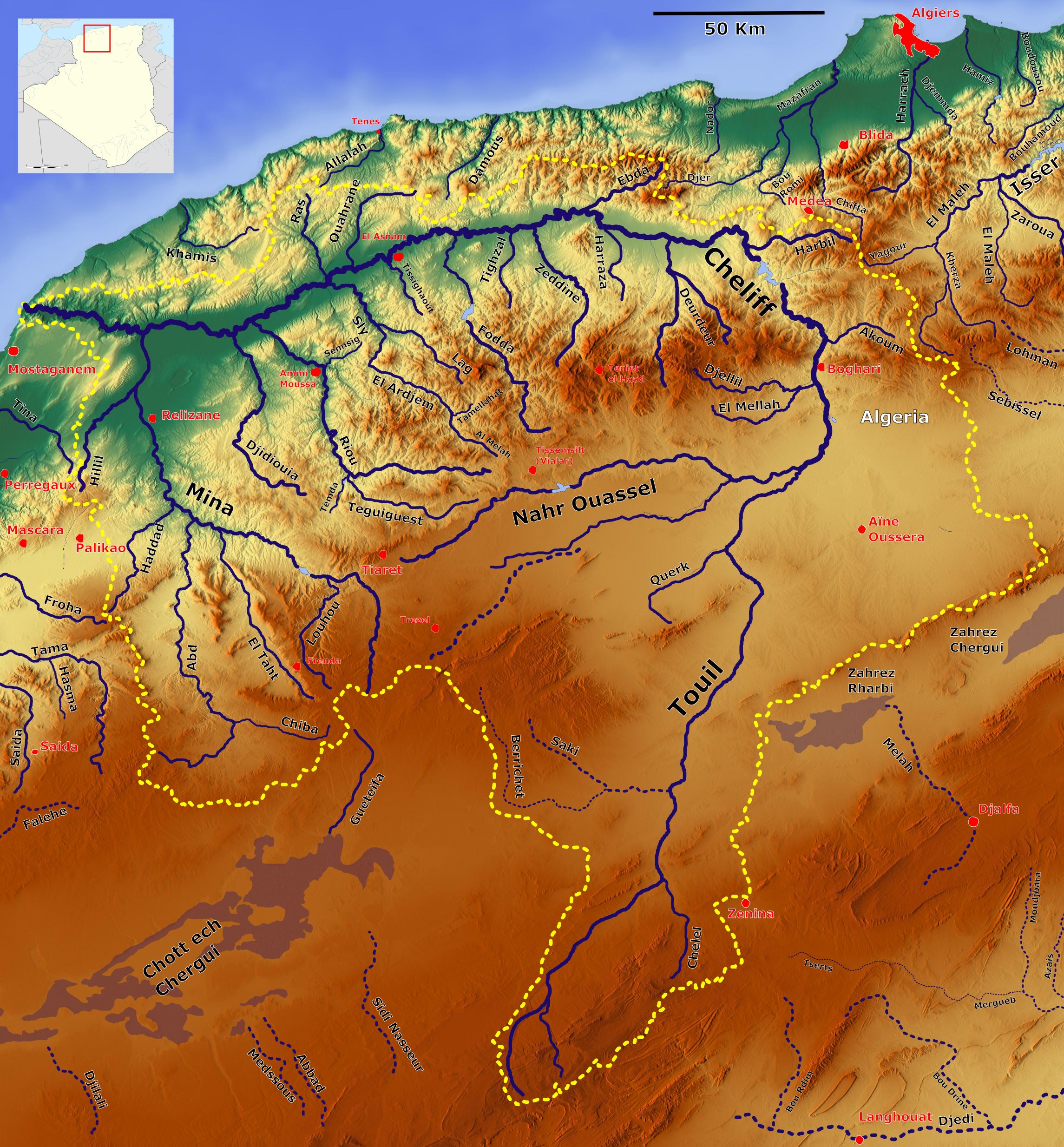
The catchment area of the Cheliff with the Sly (upper left center)

The Sly River is a river in northern Algeria, North Africa. The Sly River is a tributary of the Chelif River and joins the Chelif just east of the town of Sidi ben Thiour.

In the early 1900s, a barrage was built across the Sly, with the capability of irrigating 10,000 acres.
