= Macta =

River of Algeria

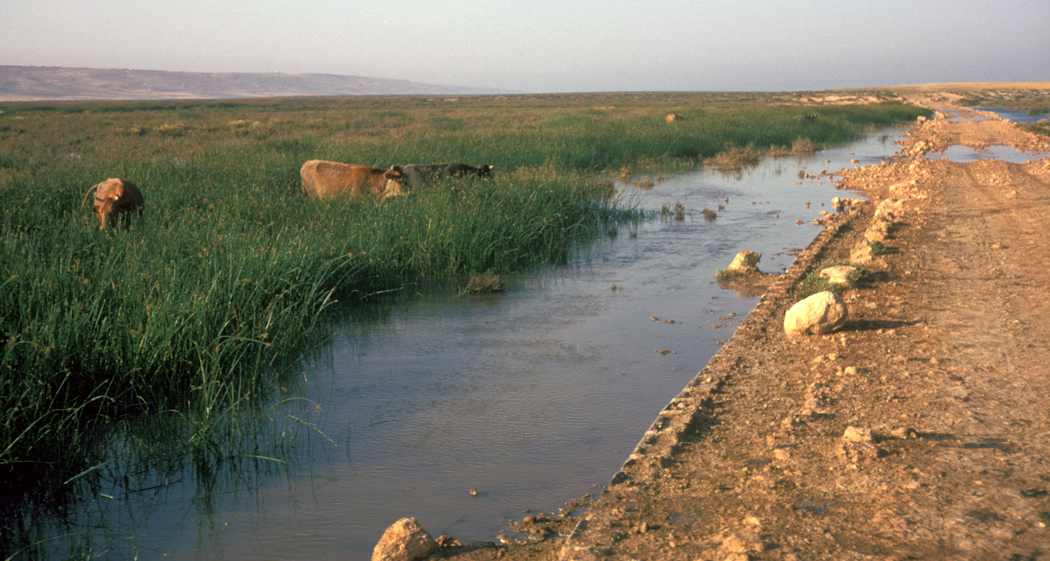
View of the Macta marshes

The river Macta is in Algeria.

The Macta is only 3 miles (4.8 km) long and, enters the sea in the Gulf of Arzeu, some 25 miles (40 km) west of the mouth of the Chelif. It is formed by the Habra (140 miles (230 km) long) and the Sig (130 miles (210 km) long), which rise in the Amour Range and flowing north before uniting in a marshy plain, from whence the Macta debouches.

At the Battle of Macta fought on 28 June 1835, Algerian Arab tribes defeated a French colonial army.
