= Meraldene River =

River in Algeria

Meraldene River وادي المرابطين
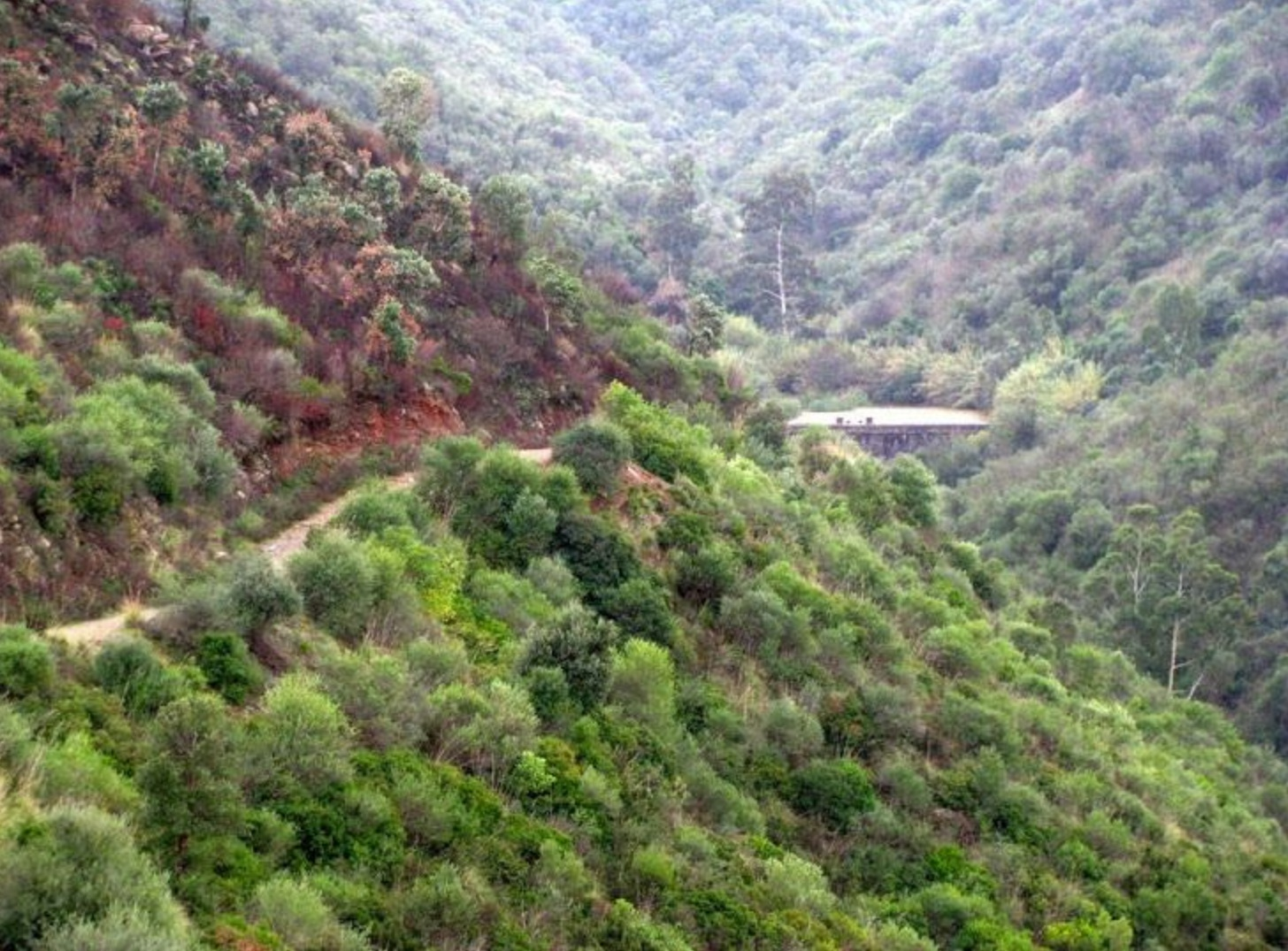
- Meraldene Dam
- Etymology: Marabouts stream
- Nickname: إيغزر ن مرابظن
- Native name: وادي مغلدن (Arabic)

Location
- Commune: Thénia
- District: Thénia
- Province: Boumerdès
- Region: Kabylie
- Country: Algeria

Physical characteristics
- Source
  - location: Beni Amrane
  - coordinates: 36°40′46″N 3°32′14″E
  - elevation: 590 m
- Mouth: Boumerdès River
  - location: Boumerdès
  - coordinates: 36°43′56″N 3°31′58″E
  - elevation: 140 m
- Length: 10,500 m (34,400 ft)
- Basin size: 140,000 m^{2} (1,500,000 ft^{2})
- Width
  - minimum: 5 m (16 ft)
  - average: 7 m (23 ft)
  - maximum: 9 m (30 ft)
- Depth
  - minimum: 3 m (9.8 ft)
  - average: 8 m (26 ft)
  - maximum: 13 m (43 ft)
- Discharge
  - location: Thénia
  - average: 25 m^{3}/s (880 cu ft/s)
  - minimum: 20 m^{3}/s (710 cu ft/s)
  - maximum: 30 m^{3}/s (1,100 cu ft/s)

Basin features
- Progression: Beni Amrane, Thénia, Boumerdès
- River system: River regime, Drainage system
- Tributaries
  - left: Arbia River
  - right: Boufroun River
- Waterbodies: Meraldene Dam
- Bridges: National Road No. 5

The Oued Meraldene or Oued Merabtene, also called Oued Bourdine, is a river of Algeria located in Kabylia within the framework of the Province of Boumerdès.

== Presentation ==
The Meraldène stream is one of the main tributaries of the Boumerdès River which is a river that finds its mouth in the Mediterranean Sea.

This river takes its source in the heights of the current commune of Beni Amrane in the Khachna Massif which shelters the peak of Bouzegza Mount.

At an altitude of 590 meters above sea level near the villages of Beni Khelifa and Azela, Oued Meraldene is born to take its course on a river bed that juts out into the current town of Thénia.

This area is rich in water resources thus feeds the Oued which then traces its route between the villages of Tabrahimt, Meraldene, Gueddara, Soumâa, Tizouighine before reaching the plateau of the village Louz.

== Mouth ==
The Meraldene River rises in flood especially during the winter and the Oued becomes impassable and dangerous, and causes floods that spread to the village of Louz beyond which it finds its mouth with the Boumerdès River which springs also from the heights of Beni Amrane and then flows into the Mediterranean.

It is because of the floods and the rising waters of the two Oueds at the level of this mouth that a bridge was built on the National Road No. 5 to pass the water and not to block road traffic.

== Dam ==
Given the profusion of water flowing through Oued Meraldene, a hydraulic dam was built to store part of its flowing water.

The Meraldene Dam was built between 1911 and 1913 to provide answers to economic questions related to the continuous supply of drinking water, often so difficult to achieve.

This is how on 26 February 1913, this important dam was completed and inaugurated and on its final acceptance.

It is a hydraulic structure 14 meters high by 70 meters wide, blocking the Meraldene Valley, and which can hold a water volume of 30,000 cubic meters.

This stored water was intended for supplying machine depots and railway workshops in the city of Thénia concurrently with the direct intake 300 meters upstream.

The design of this important hydraulic structure made it possible to collect sufficient water for the industrial needs of the Thénia region.

Its final acceptance was made with the dam full, with all the conditions that were met such as the connection of electricity to operate its pumps.

== Gallery ==
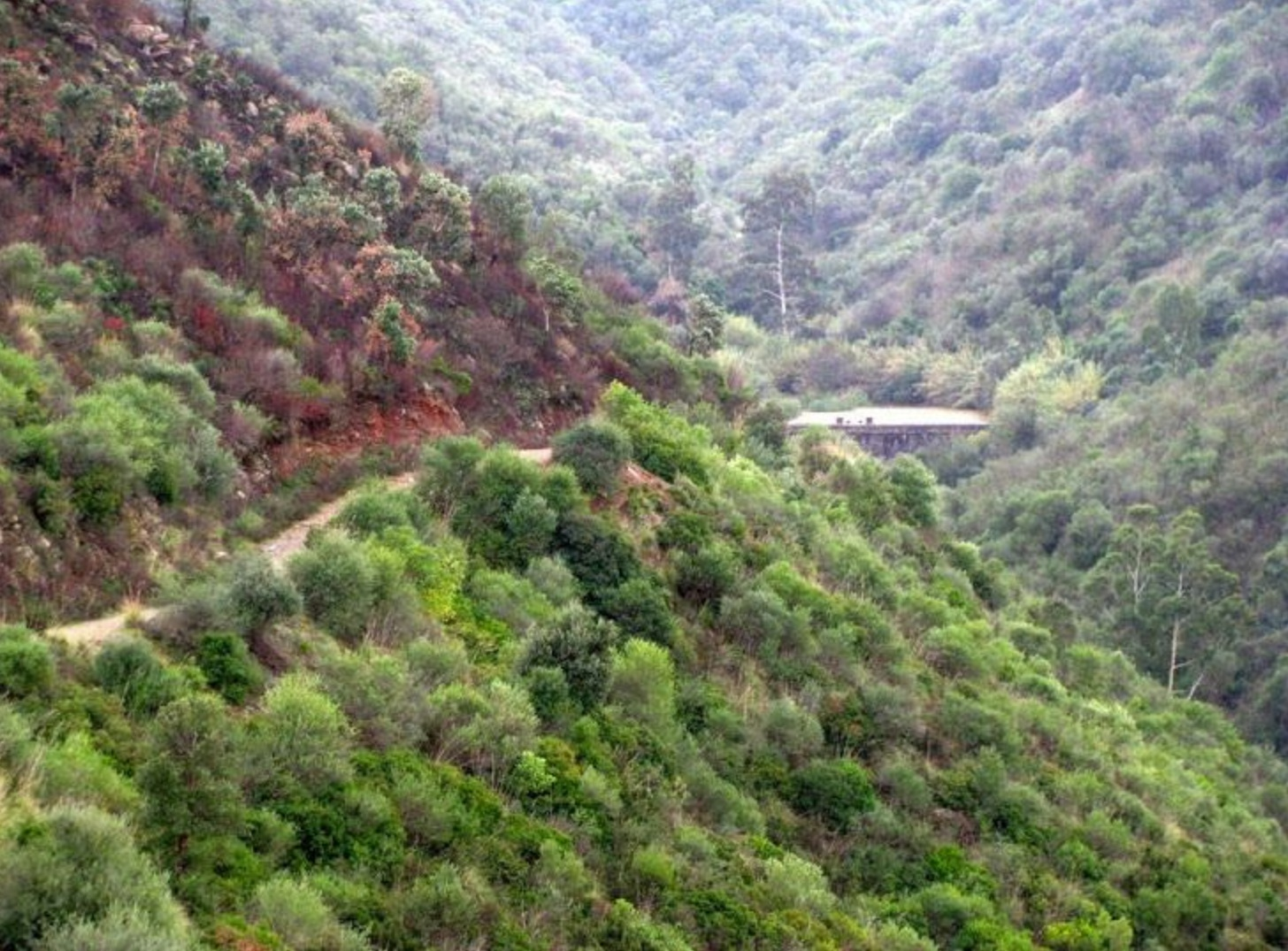
Meraldene Dam

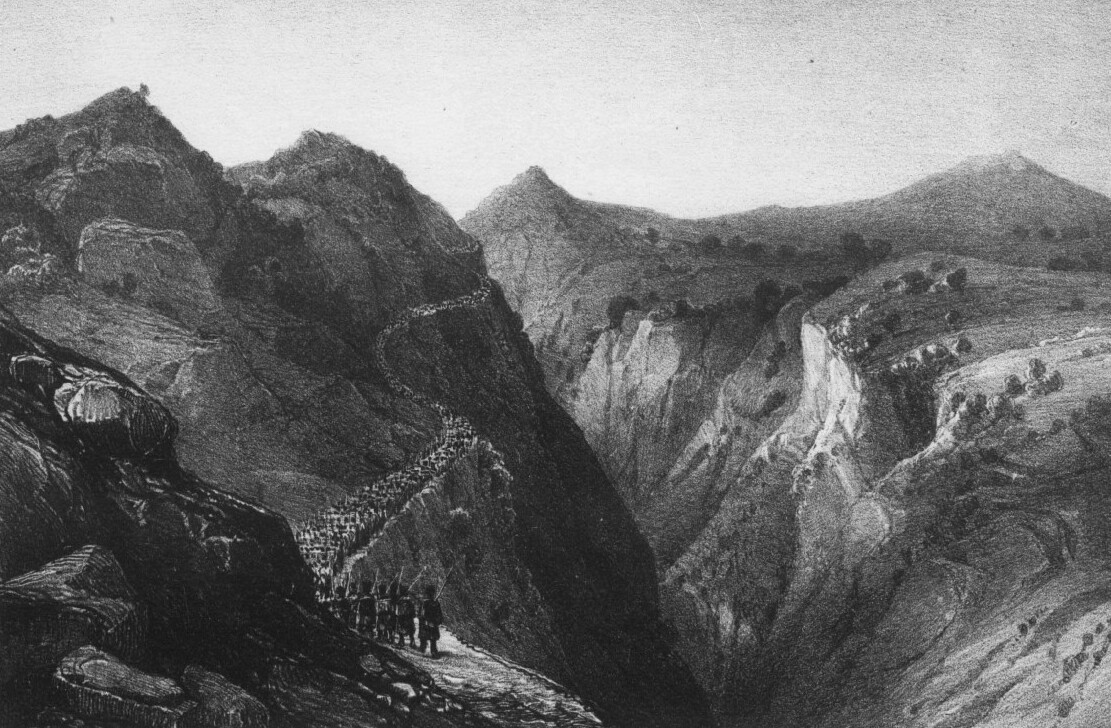
Meraldene Ravine

== See also ==
- List of rivers of Algeria
- Meraldene Dam
- Boumerdès Valley
- Khachna Massif
- Bouzegza Mountain
- List of dams of Algeria
- National Road No. 5 (Algeria)
