= Beni Amrane =

Beni Amrane بنى عمران
- Commune and town
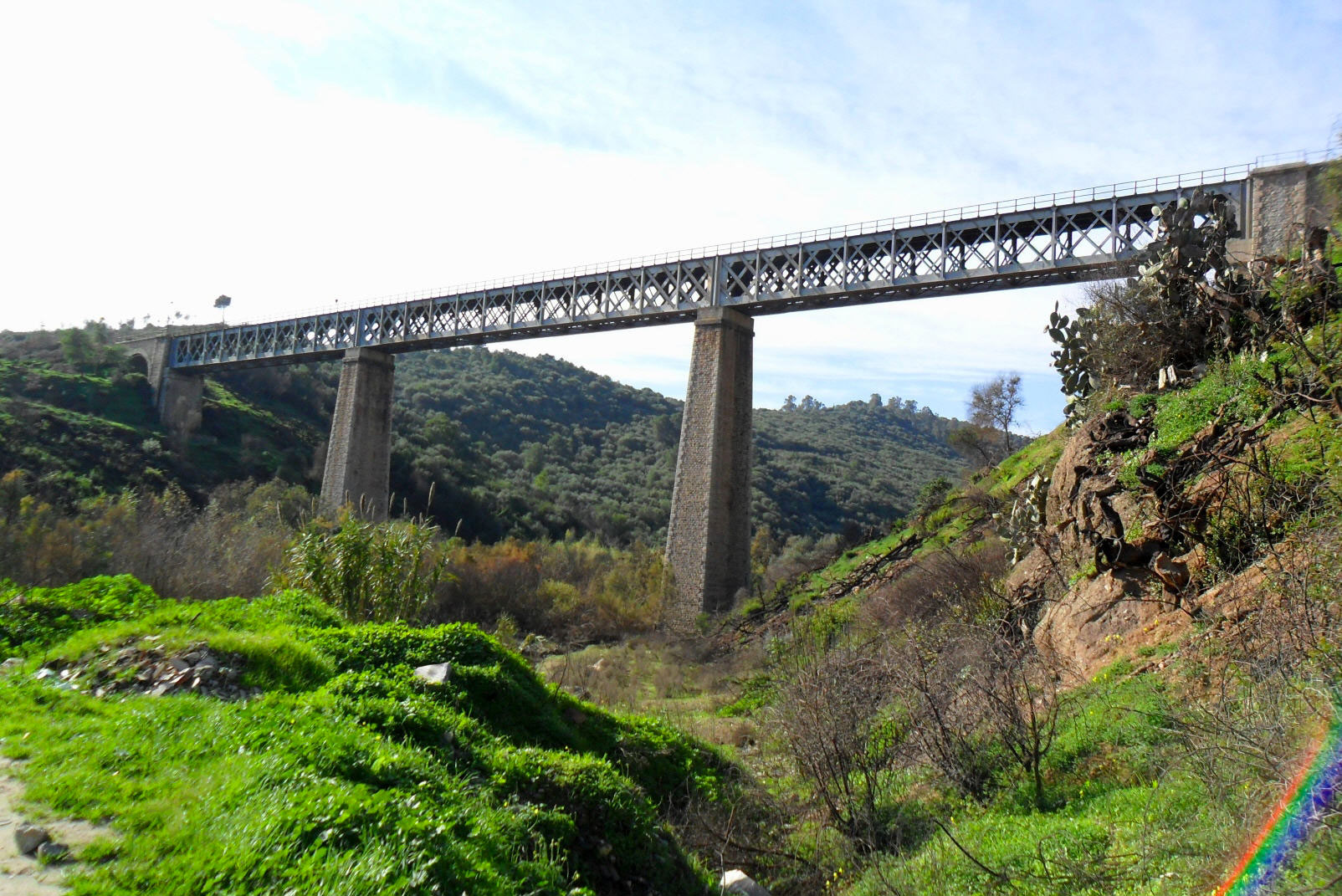
- Nickname: At Ɛemran

- Location within Algeria
- Coordinates: 36°40′6″N 3°35′31″E
- Country: Algeria
- Province: Boumerdès Province
- APC: 2012-2017

Government
  - Type: Municipality
  - Mayor: Ahmed AFRA (FFS)

Population (2008)
  - Total: 23,621
- Time zone: UTC+1 (CET)
- CP: 35425

Beni Amrane is a town and commune in Boumerdès Province, Algeria. According to the 1998 census it has a population of 21,452.

== Villages ==
The villages of the commune of Beni Amrane are:

- A
  - Aït Si Saïd
  - Azela
- B
  - Beni Khelifa
  - Bouchelaghem
  - Boukaraï
  - Bouredjouane
- C
  - Chorfa
- D
  - Debagha
- G
  - Ghazibaouene
- H
  - Haddada
- O
  - Oued Djenane
- S
  - Souiga
- T
  - Talilt
  - Talmat
  - Toulmout
  - Touzaline

== History ==
=== French conquest ===
- Expedition of the Col des Beni Aïcha (1837)
- First Battle of the Issers (1837)
- Battle of the Col des Beni Aïcha (1871)

=== Algerian Revolution ===
- Ferme Gauthier

=== Terrorist bombings ===
- 2008 Beni Amrane bombings (9 June 2008)

== Rivers ==
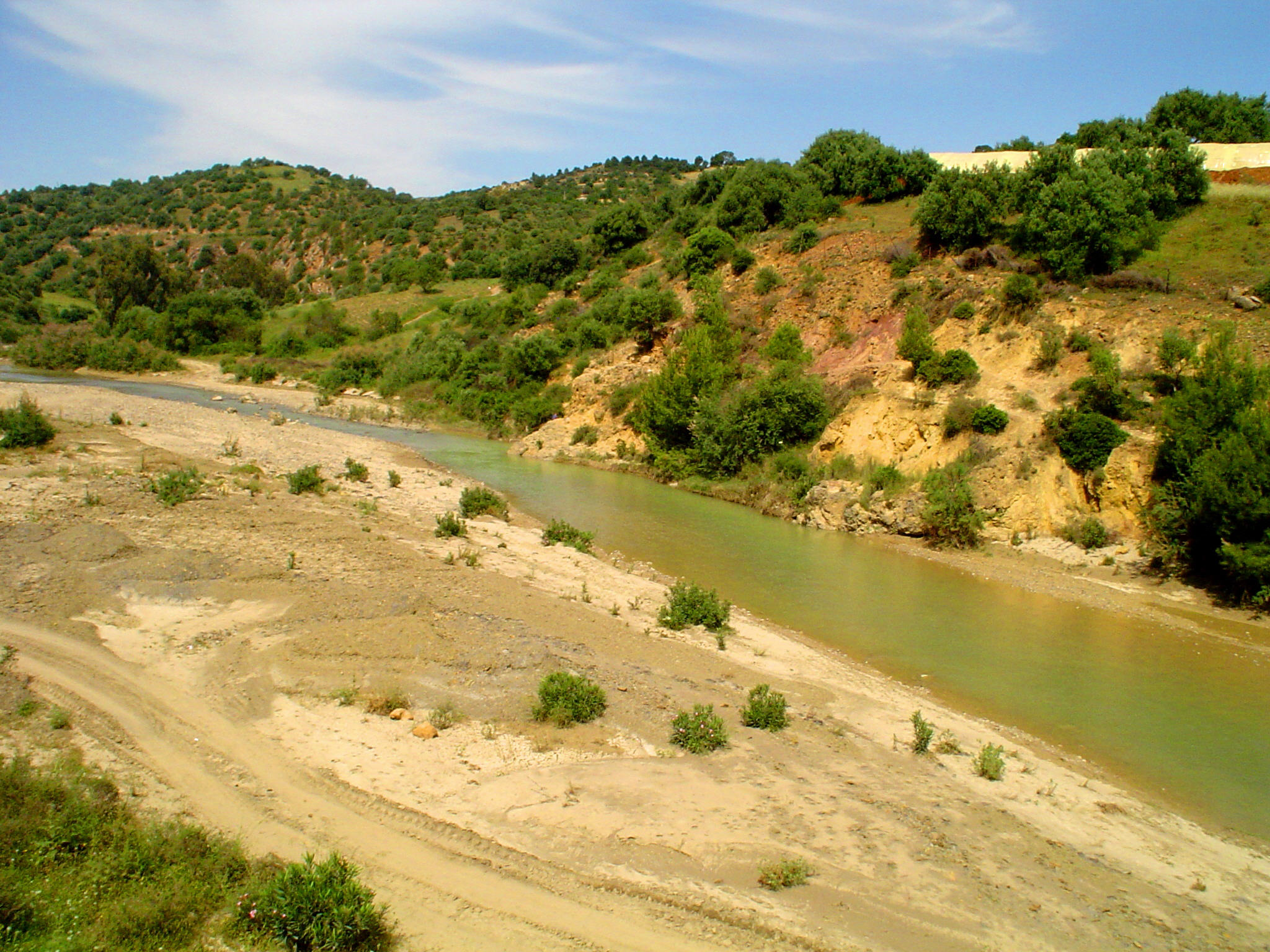
Isser River

This commune is crossed by several rivers:

- Boumerdès River
- Corso River
- Isser River
- Meraldene River

== Football clubs ==
Club	Division	Level	Location	Logo
US Beni Amrane	Ligue de Football de la Wilaya	3	Beni Amrane	

== Notable people ==
- Boualem Boukacem (born 1957), Algerian artist.
- Maamar Bettayeb (born 1953), Algerian academician.
- Mohamed Hassaïne (1945–1994), Algerian journalist.
