= Battle of Moulouya (1847) =

1847 battle between Algeria and Morocco

Date	December, 1847
Location	Moulouya river, Morocco
Result	Algerian victory

Belligerents
Emirate of Abdelkader	Alawi Sultanate; Support: Kingdom of France

Commanders and leaders
Emir Abdelkader; Muhammad ibn Yahya †	Moulay Mohammed; Moulay Soliman

Strength
~ 2,000 men	5,000 Moroccan cavalry

Casualties and losses
Heavy	Heavy

The Battle of Moulouya was a military engagement between the forces of the Emirate of Abdelkader and the Alawi Sultanate who were supported by the French.

== Background ==
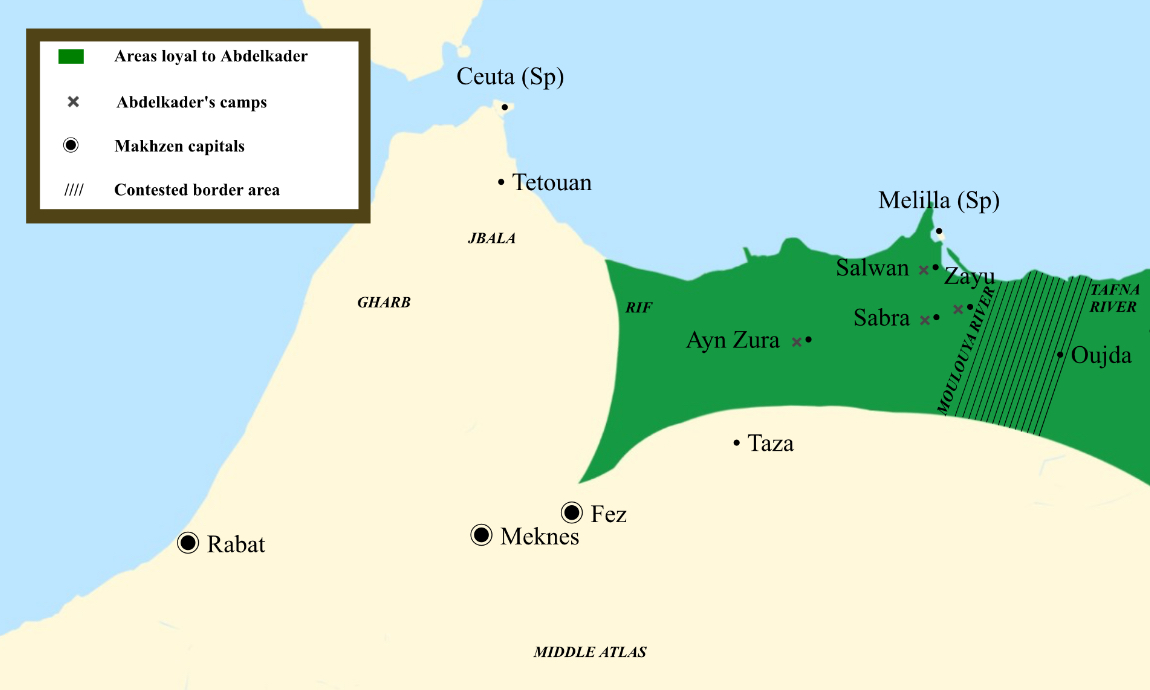
Map depicting the situation of Emir Abdelkader during 1845-1847

Following the Battle of Isly, the Moroccans concluded the Treaty of Tangiers with the French, one of its stipulations was that Emir Abdelkader was to be outlawed in Morocco. Emir Abdelkader was then camped at the gates of the Rif where he established his authority over several tribes including the Beni Snassen, M’talsa, Beni Bou Yahi and the Guelaya. His authority was also recognised by the Moroccan tribes surrounding Melilla. The Moroccan sultan demanded that Emir Abdelkader must either leave or surrender, as a result the scholars of Al-Azhar authorised that Emir Abdelkader was able to fight and wage war against the Moroccan sultan stating that he had deviated from Islam.

A Moroccan force was dispatched to capture Emir Abdelkader in the Battle of Oued Aslaf where he inflicted a crushing defeat against the Moroccans, killing the commander al-Hamra and capturing his family although he then sent them to Fez with honour. Following this incident, Emir Abdelkader sent his deputy Al-Bouhamdi to Fez to negotiate with the Moroccan sultan, however his reception was refused and the Abd al-Rahman had him thrown in prison and forced him to drink poison resulting in his death. had Another engagement occurred in the Battle of Agueddin where Emir Abdelkader once again triumphed over the Moroccan forces.

== Battle ==
The Moroccan sultan was profoundly impacted by the defeat of his forces at Agueddin, consequently he sent another contingent against Emir Abdelkader this time composed of 5,000 Moroccan cavalrymen. They were ordered to pursue and capture the Emir. Emir Abdelkader calmly waited as they approached. Emir Abdelkader defeated the Moroccan cavalrymen at the Moulouya river, he used an effective assault and retreat tactic, ploughing through the Moroccan forces. One of Emir Abdelkader's commanders, Muhammad ibn Yahya, perished in the fight. He was the favourite among his commanders.

== Aftermath ==
Emir Abdelkader was in a dire situation, which resulted in him entering French territory and surrendering. An agreement for his surrender was reached with Lamoricière, but only on the condition that his companions would be able to leave if they wished and go to Alexandria or Acre.
