= Battle of Agueddin =

1847 battle between Algeria and Morocco

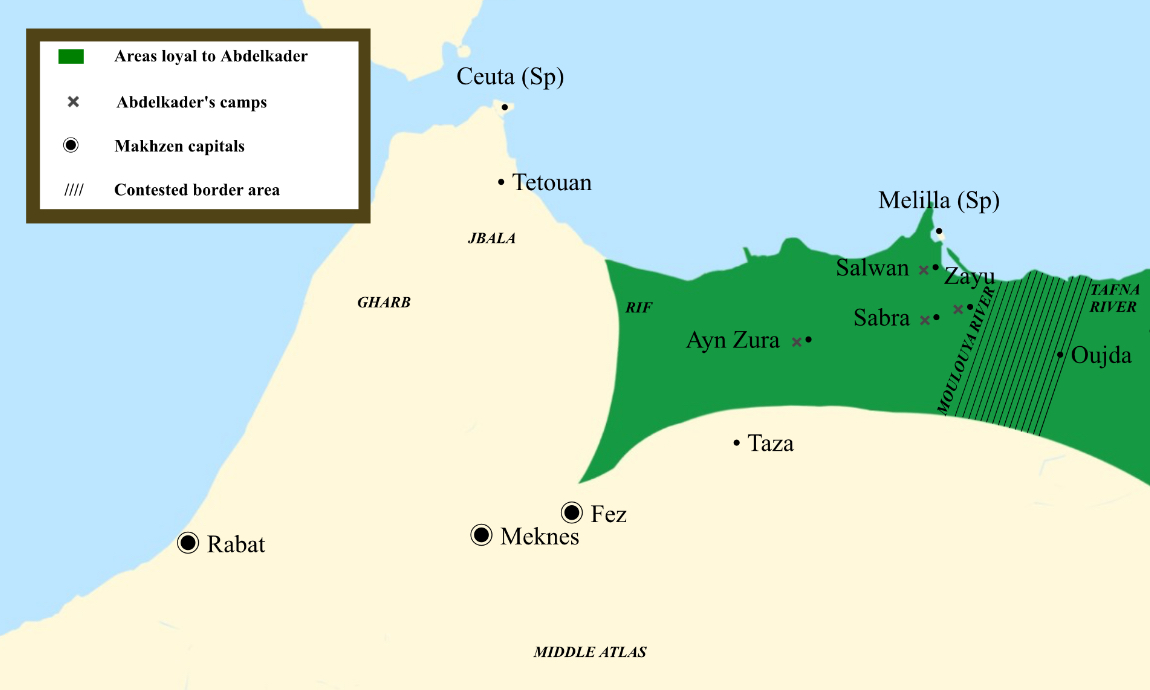
- Map depicting Emir Abdelkader’s camps and the areas loyal to him (1845-1847)
Date	December, 1847
Location	Agueddin, Morocco
Result	Algerian victory

Belligerents
Emirate of Abdelkader	Alawi Sultanate; Support: Kingdom of France

Commanders and leaders
Emir Abdelkader	Moulay Mohammed; Moulay Soliman

Strength
2,000 men	50,000 men

Casualties and losses
200 men	Heavy

The Battle of Agueddin took place between the Emirate of Abdelkader in Algeria and the Alaouite Dynasty of Morocco in December 1847.

== Background ==
Emir Abdelkader was outlawed in Morocco following the 1844 Treaty of Tangiers. Emir Abdelkader subsequently established camps in the Rif area which he gained control of and established his authority over several tribes such as the M’talsa, Beni Bou Yahi, Beni Snassen and Guelaya. Following his treaty with the French the Moroccan sultan apologised to them for his intervention and argued that the Rif was outside of his authority and subject to the authority of Emir Abdelkader.

This led to a series of confrontations between him and the Moroccan forces in which even an assassin had been sent in an attempt to kill him, these tensions ultimately led to the Battle of Oued Aslaf which resulted in an Algerian victory and the death of the Moroccan commander al-Hamra. An agreement was also concluded between the Moroccans and the French whereby the French supplied the Moroccan commander with ammunition and jointly agreed to blockade the path of Emir Abdelkader to prevent him from withdrawing to the south.

On 10 December 1847, when Emir Abdelkader's camp was situated in Agueddin, he was warned of a Moroccan army of 50,000 men split into three divisions led by the two sons of the Moroccan sultan Abd al-Rahman Moulay Mohammed and Moulay Soliman.

== Battle ==
On the 11th of December Emir Abdelkader gathered 1,200 cavalry and 800 infantry and prepared for battle. At night camels that were covered with halfa, which had been dipped in tar and pitch were driven in the front of the column. After marching for two hours, Abdelkader encountered the first Moroccan division, he then set fire to the halfa covered camels and they plunged against the Moroccan cavalry. The Moroccans were bewildered, terrified and ultimately defeated, abandoning their tents, arms and baggage. Emir Abdelkader advanced and surprised and defeated the second Moroccan division in the same manner as the first.

Emir Abdelkader advanced on to the third division where he was checked by heavy fire, as a result he withdrew and took position. By mid-day 5,000 Moroccan cavalrymen set out to attack Abdelkader who calmly waited for them. When they were at charging distance he led his men to attack them, ploughing through them and shaking them off using a skillful combination of assault and retreat Abdelkader was successful.

== Aftermath ==
Although Abdelkader was able to defeat the Moroccans during all of the earlier military engagements, they still advanced, but cautiously. The defeat at Agueddin profoundly impacted the Moroccan sultan, as a result he sent another Moroccan contingent composed of 5,000 cavalry to pursue and capture Abdelkader however they were defeated at the Moulouya river. Emir Abdelkader made the decision to withdraw from Algeria and enter French territory which ultimately led to his surrender.
