= Siege of the Mechouar of Tlemcen =

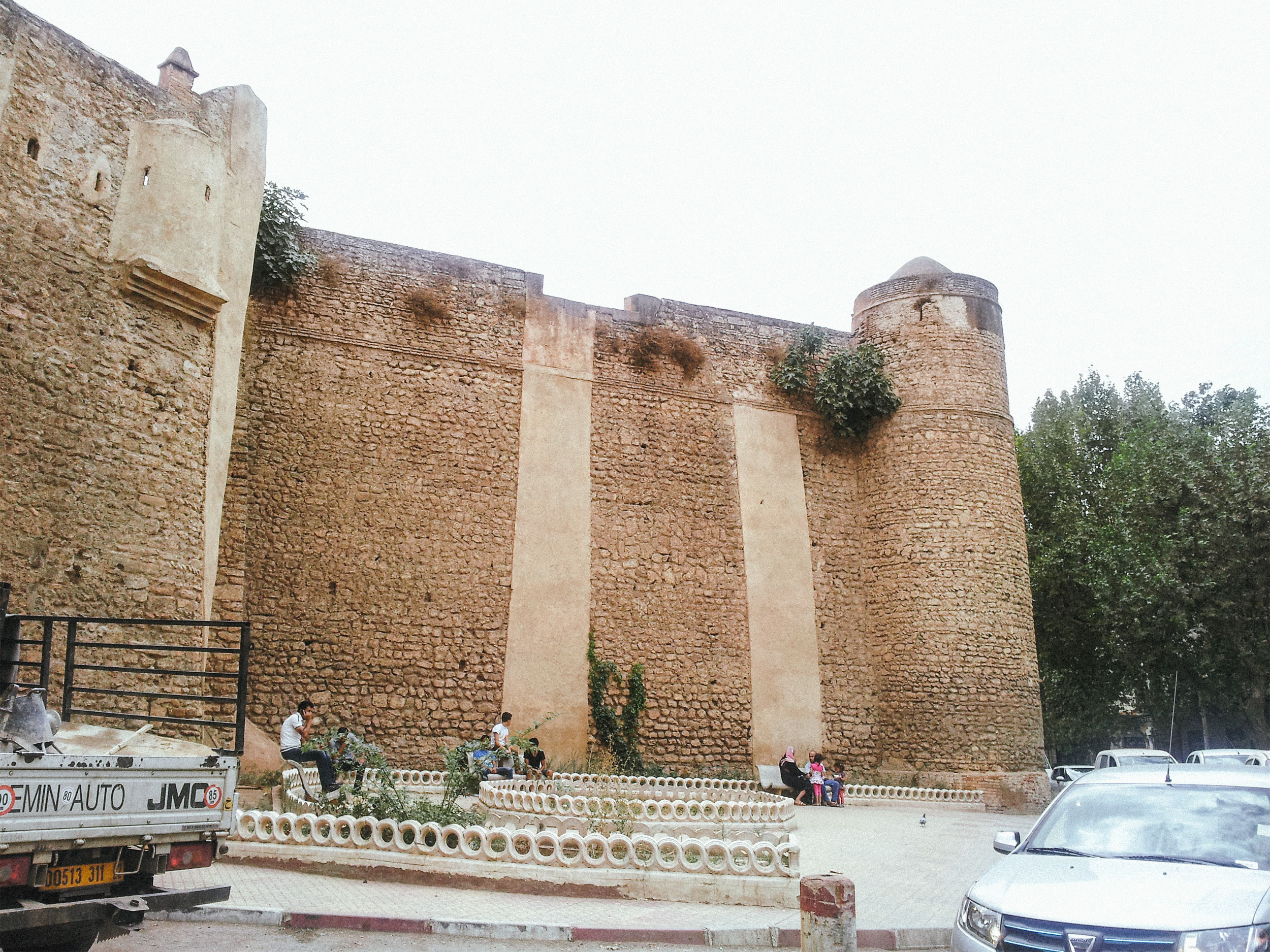
Date	1834 - 1836
Location	Mechouar of Tlemcen
Result	The siege fails The Kouloughlis appeal for French help
Territorial changes	France occupied the mechouar in support of the Kouloughli garrison First French occupation of Tlemcen

Belligerents
Emirate of Abdelkader	Kouloughlis de Tlemcen

Commanders and leaders
Emir Abdelkader Bou Hamedi	Mustapha Ben Ismaïl

The siege of the mechouar of Tlemcen, the citadel of the city, was led by Emir Abdelkader from 1834 to 1836 against the garrison entrenched within its walls, composed of Turks and Kouloughlis.

== Context ==
Abdelkader had to contend with the defiance of the old Beylical system: the Makhzen tribes, such as the Douair and the Smalas, and the Kouloughlis broke away from his authority. The latter remained barricaded in the Mechouar, the citadel of Tlemcen. As early as 1831, before the Emir's accession, the Moorish and Kouloughli populations were already in conflict: the Moors prevented the Mechouar from being supplied, and the Kouloughlis cut the water conduit that passed through the Mechouar and supplied the city. Mahiedine, the Emir's father, a Moqqadem of the Qadiriyya order, had already attempted, without success, to mediate between the two sides.

== Events ==
Upon establishing himself in Tlemcen, Emir Abdelkader relied on the Moors party, appointing Bou Hamedi, a Berber from the Oulhaça tribe, as his khalifa. The Kouloughlis guarded the mechouar (fortified village) for him. Confident in his forces, the Emir laid siege to the mechouar, but his artillery, too weak to breach the fortifications, prevented him from achieving a decisive victory. After maintaining a blockade for about six weeks, he was forced to move eastward and entrusted the continuation of operations to Bou Hamedi and Ben Nouna. They limited themselves to monitoring the Kouloughli defenders from a distance, without launching any significant offensive action. During the siege of the mechouar, the Kouloughlis destroyed the Jewish buildings located near the citadel to clear their line of fire. The houses along the front line were transformed into defensive positions, and exchanges of fire were frequent, while the besieged sometimes launched sorties into the city. In 1835, the change in French policy and the convention concluded by General Trézel with the Douairs and the Smélas gave renewed hope to the defenders of the Mechouar. Despite his victory at Macta, Abd el-Kader failed to obtain the surrender of the Kouloughlis. Forced to confront General Clauzel's offensive against Mascara, his prestige was diminished. The city's garrison was commanded by Mustapha Ben Ismaïl.

In retaliation, he lured several hundred Kouloughlis into an ambush, during which 75 of them were executed. In December 1835, the Kouloughlis sought French help against Abd el-Kader. General Clauzel then organized an expedition to Tlemcen, forcing the emir to evacuate the city while some of the Hadars (city dwellers, Moors) took refuge in the mountains. After the French occupation, an indemnity was imposed on the inhabitants to cover the costs of the expedition, a measure that primarily affected the Kouloughlis who remained and provoked strong criticism in France. Appointed commander of the Mechouar, Eugène Cavaignac undertook the restoration of the fortress, relied on the Kouloughlis, and encouraged the return of the Hadars. He also maintained Mustapha ben Bey Makallech, designated bey of Tlemcen by Clauzel, at the head of the city and gradually managed to restore a certain stability.
