= Capture of Mascara (1831) =

- Part of French conquest of Algeria
Date	1831
Location	Mascara, Algeria
Result	Kaderian victory

Belligerents
(Regency of Algiers) Mascara Garrison	Emirate of Abdelkader; Support: Tribes of Makhzen Saharaouia; Bordjia tribe

Commanders and leaders
Unknown	Emir Abdelkader; Mahieddine Abu Abdelkader

Strength
Unknown	Unknown

Casualties and losses
Heavy	Unknown

The Capture of Mascara in 1831 was a conflict that happened during the establishment of the Abdelkader state following the collapse of the Regency of Algiers.

== Battle ==
Mahieddine, Abdelkader's father, led the uprising. He was determined to fight the remaining Algerian garrisons. Abdelkader and Mahieddine attacked Mascara. Abdelkader distinguished himself in battle, appearing to be "safe from bullets and cannonballs, with horses killed beneath him". He received assistance from the Sahrawi Makhzen tribes, who besieged the city, along with the Bordjia from the Mascara region. The plundered the city, and the entire garrison was massacred, possibly after its surrender. The garrison fought to the end.

== Aftermath ==
Encouraged by this expedition, Abdelkader then headed towards Oran to dislodge the French forces. The following year, Abdelkader was recognized as a sultan and received the allegiance or "moubayaa" of the allied tribes in the Grand Mosque of Mascara.
