= Emir Abdelkader =

Algerian religious and military leader (1808–1883)

Amir al-Mu'minin Abd al-Qadir al-Jaza'iri عـبـد الـقـادر الـجـزائـري
- عبد القادر ابن محي الدين
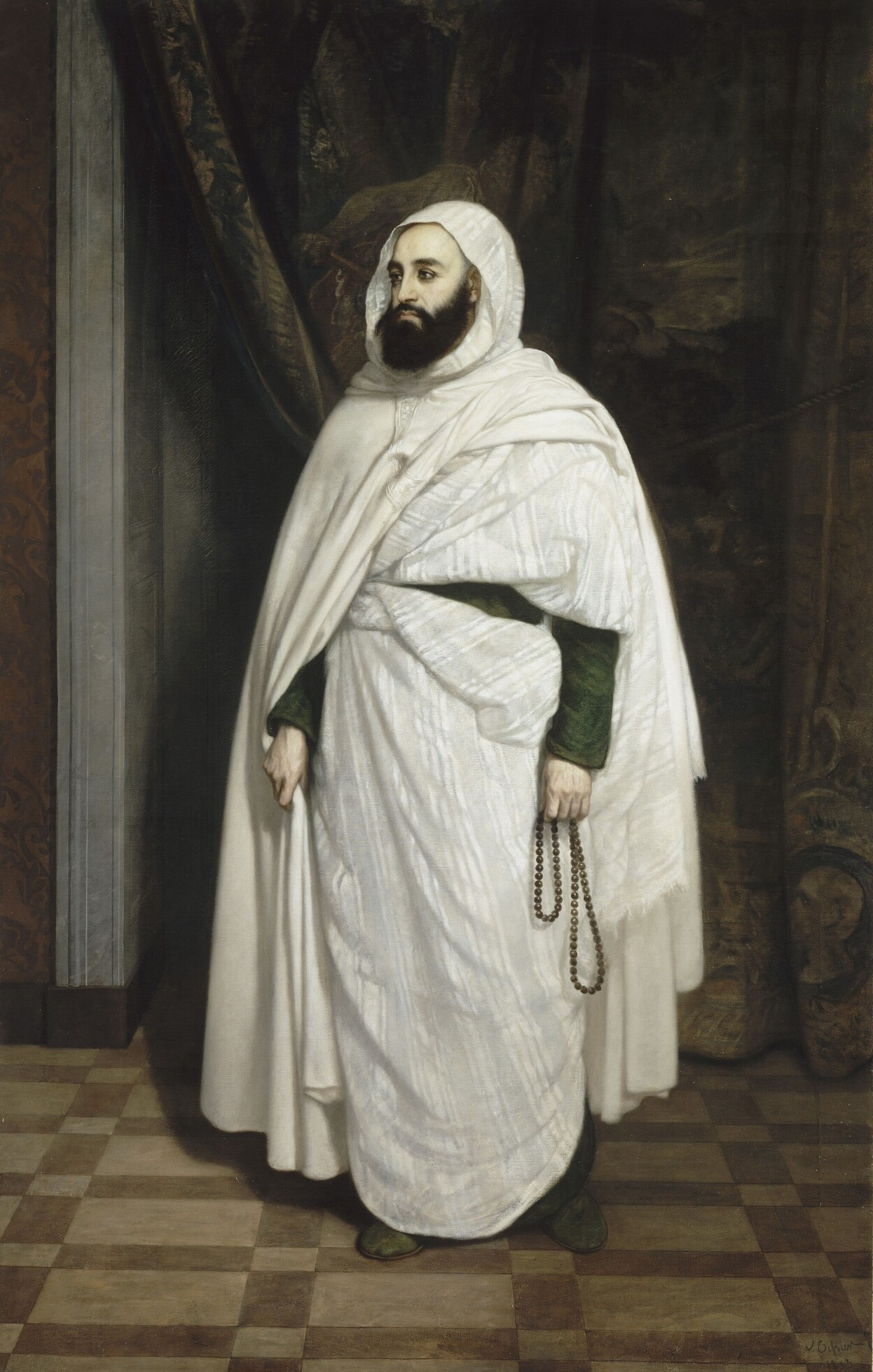
- Portrait by Jean-Baptiste-Ange Tissier, 1852
- Born: Abd al-Qadir ibn Muhyi al-Din al-Hasani between 1806 and 1808, maybe on 6 September 1808; Guetna, Regency of Algiers, Ottoman Empire
- Died: 26 May 1883; Damascus, Eyalet of Damascus, Ottoman Empire
- Burial place: Damascus, and since 1965: El Alia Cemetery, Algiers
- Military career
- Rank: Emir
- Conflicts: French conquest of Algeria; Capture of Mascara; Battle of Macta; Battle of Sig; Battle of Sidi Brahim; Battle of Oued Aslaf; Battle of Agueddin; Battle of Moulouya
- Awards: France: Legion of Honour; Holy See: Order of Pope Pius IX; Ottoman Empire: Order of the Medjidie; Kingdom of Greece: Order of the Redeemer; Russian Empire: Order of the White Eagle; Kingdom of Prussia: Order of the Black Eagle; Kingdom of Italy: Order of Saints Maurice and Lazarus

Abd al-Qadir ibn Muhyi al-Din (between 1806 and 1808 – 26 May 1883; Arabic: عبد القادر ابن محي الدين, romanized: ʿAbd al-Qādir ibn Muḥy al-Dīn), known as Emir Abdelkader or ʿAbd al-Qadir al-Hasani al-Jazaʾiri, was an Algerian religious and military leader who led a struggle against the French colonial invasion of Algiers from 1831 to 1847.

As an Islamic scholar and Sufi who unexpectedly found himself leading a military campaign, he assembled a coalition of Algerian tribes that resisted one of the most powerful armies in Europe for 17 years. His treatment of prisoners and civilians has often been cited as an early example of humanitarian conduct in warfare, particularly by his Christian opponents.

After his surrender in 1847, he was detained in France for almost five years before being released by Napoleon III and taken to Bursa. Two years later, in 1855, he settled in Damascus. In 1860, his intervention to halt the massacre of the Christian community in Damascus earned him honours and awards from several countries. It was also in Damascus that he wrote his major work, the Kitab al-Mawaqif (the "Book of Halts").

== Name ==
His full name was Abdelkader Ibn Mahieddine El-Hasani.

- "Abdelkader" — which is transliterated as ʿAbd al-Qādir ("servant of the Almighty")— can also be spelled "Abd al-Kader", "Abd el-Kader", "Abdul Kader", "Abdel Kader", "Abd el-Qadir", etc.
- "Ibn Mahieddine" (or "Muhyi ad-Din") means "son of Mahieddine", his father’s name.
- "El-Hasani" refers to his descent from Hasan ibn Ali, grandson of Muhammad, hence his status as sharif.
- During his exile in Syria, he was given the name "El-Djazairi" ("the Algerian"), which was passed on to his descendants.
- He was appointed emir (amīr al-muʾminīn, "Commander of the Faithful") in 1832.

The choice of the name Abdelkader, common in the emir’s family tree, pays homage to Abdul Qadir Gilani, the 11th-century founder of the Qadiriyya Sufi brotherhood in Baghdad, to which Abdelkader’s family belongs.

== Family background ==
Abdelkader was born in Ottoman Regency of Algiers between 1806 and 1808 (Note: Most modern sources give 6 September 1808, but the precise date is not clear. The earliest Arabic sources note his birth as occurring between 1221 and 1223 anno hegirae (i.e., AD 1806–1808), with biographical works written by his sons specifying Rajab 1222. For a full discussion of the problem, see Bouyerdene 2012, p. 5.) in the hamlet of el Guetna (situated on the El-Hammam wadi, about 25 kilometres west of Mascara), into a family belonging to the religious and marabout elite.

Abdelkader belonged to a prominent religious ''awlad sayyid'' family of Arab origin, whose genealogical tradition traced its descent through the Hasanid–Idrisid line. Abdelkader's father, Muhieddine al-Hasani, was the muqaddam of the Qadiriyya zawiya of Oued El-Hammam. His religious knowledge and uprightness made him a mediator between the Bey’s authority and the people. His generosity towards the poor was well known, as were his integrity and impartiality, which meant he was regularly called upon to settle disputes between individuals as well as between tribes. He was on good terms with Sultan Abd al-Rahman of Morocco, who opened his borders to the peoples of the West as early as 1830. Abdelkader’s mother, Lalla Zohra, a woman of letters and well-versed in religion, was the daughter of Omar Bendoukha, muqaddam of a zawiya in Hammam Bou Hadjar. Affiliated with the Hachem tribe, this family had lived in the Ghriss plain since Abd el-Kadr ben Ahmed, a learned figure known as Sidi Kada, settled there around 1640; his mausoleum remains one of the most visited religious sites in the region. From a very young age, Abdelkader was steeped in stories about his ancestors, whose piety and learning served as edifying examples to him.

== Youth ==
Abdelkader grew up in his father's zawiya, which by the early nineteenth century had become the centre of a thriving community on the banks of the Oued al-Hammam. Like the hundreds of students supported by the zawiya, he received a traditional education that encompassed the principles and practice of Islam, the rules of etiquette (adab), the practice of virtues, reading and writing, grammar, Quranic exegesis (tafsir), hadith, and jurisprudence (fiqh). According to contemporary biographical accounts, he could read and write by the age of five. At 12, he was authorized to comment on the Quran and the hadiths. A brilliant student, he memorised the entire Quran at the age of 14, thereby receiving the title of hafiz. A year later, his father sent him to Oran, the seat of the Turkish administration, for further education. A gifted orator, he captured the attention of his peers with his poetry and religious oratory. His skill in taming and riding horses dated from his early childhood.

Raised in faith, morality, and moderation, Abdelkader found it difficult to cope with the lax atmosphere in Oran and returned to El Guetna before the end of the school year. There he continued his studies for two years with his cousin Mustapha ben Thami, son of the mufti of Oran.

In 1825, he set out on the Hajj, the pilgrimage to Mecca, with his father. He then stayed in Medina, before travelling to Damascus and Baghdad, where he visited the graves of noted Muslims such as ibn Arabi and Abdul Qadir Gilani (called "al-Jilālī" in Algeria). Returning to Mecca a year after his first visit, he undertook a second pilgrimage. These experiences reinforced his religious commitment. On his way back home, he was impressed by the reforms carried out by Muhammad Ali of Egypt. He arrived in his homeland in 1827 and, that same year, married his cousin Kheira bint Boutaleb

== French invasion and resistance ==
=== 1830–1833: French invasion, election of Abdelkader ===
At the beginning of the 19th century, the Ottoman Regency of Algiers was a weakened state. Numerous rebellions were brutally suppressed. Relations with France, which for some forty years had been delaying repayment of a substantial debt owed to the Regency, were strained, and the "fly-whisk incident" (April 1827) served as a pretext for the French navy to blockade the port of Algiers. It lasted until June 1830, followed by the invasion of Algiers and the exile of Hussein Dey (10 July 1830), preludes to the colonial offensive. In France, the July Revolution (27–29 July 1830) brought an end to the Restoration (Charles X), which was replaced by the July Monarchy (Louis-Philippe I).

In January 1831, the French army took Oran, the capital of the Western Province, and drove out the Bey and his garrison. Left to their own devices, the tribes of the West experienced a period of political instability: rival powers, recurring intertribal conflicts, looting and the collapse of trade caused by insecurity, as well as the absence of effective taxation and judicial administration.

In April 1832, Abdelkader's father was asked to lead a resistance campaign against the occupiers. Muhieddine called for jihad and he and his son were among those involved in early attacks below the walls of the city, but to no avail, prompting the leaders of the three tribes of Oranie —the Hachem, the Beni Amer and the Ghraba— to join forces.

On 22 November 1832, representatives of these tribes gathered at Khassibia, near Mascara, to elect a leader. Following Muhieddine's refusal of the position on the grounds that he was too old (he died 7 months later), Abdelkader, aged around 25, was elected Commander of the Believers, Amir al-Mu'minin (typically abbreviated to "Emir"), and so leader of the resistance. Abdelkader was seen as an appropriate candidate not only because of his age but also because of his own learning, religious devotion and claimed descent from Muhammad. Despite the reluctance of certain other tribes, the appointment was confirmed five days later at the great mosque of Mascara, and then by Sultan Abd al-Rahman of Morocco, whose pre-eminence Abdelkader was careful to acknowledge. Proclamation of Mascara:

'To the communities of the Arabs and Berbers: Know that the affairs of Islamic princely authority and of the upholding of the religious duties of the Muhammadan community have now passed into the hands of the Protector of Religion, the Lord Abdelkeder ibn Muhy al-Din. And the declaration of allegiance has been made to him in recognition thereof, by the 'ulama, the sharifs, and the notables at Mascara. And he has become our emir and guarantor of the upholding of the bounds of God's law. He does not follow in the footsteps of any other, nor imitate their example. He does not take a surplus of riches for his own share, as others may have done. He does not burden his subjects in anything save that in which he is commanded by the immaculate shari'a, and he disposes of nothing save in the proper manner. And he has unfurled the banner of jihad, and bared his forearm to the task, for the welfare of the servants of God, and the prosperity of the land.'

The western tribes responded in contrasting ways to the call for jihad: the power vacuum left by the capture of Algiers led some makhzen tribes and the Kouloughlis to ask him to recognize the authority of the Turks of the Constantinois; the Moors of Tlemcen, deprived of the Mechouar occupied by the Kouloughlis, asked him to recognize the authority of the Sultan of Morocco; and the Douair and Smala makhzen tribes, commanded by Moustapha Ben Ismail, asked him to recognize their agreement with France. Abdelkader suppressed any attempts at secession; upon his entry into Tlemcen (summer 1833), he had his authority recognized, except by the Turks and the Kouloughlis of the Mechouar, who, however, consenting to establish peaceful relations, offered him a golden parasol, but without opening the gates of their citadel to him. With the support of the Moors, the emir launched the siege of the Mechouar, which failed. (A further attempt, in 1835, also failed and was followed by an appeal to the French by the Kouloughli garrison, which led to the first French occupation of the city (January 1836).)

It was in the name of Islam and jihad that the Emir rallied and motivated the numerous tribes and their fighters, and within a year, through a combination of raids against the rebel tribes and a cautious policy, he succeeded in uniting the tribes of the region and restoring security. According to Leslie Gross-Wyrtzen, Abdelkader was an opponent of abolition; he considered slavery as a God-given right. For the Emir, the French opposition to slavery was among the grievances that he invoked as a reason to oppose the colonizers. His sphere of influence now covered the entire province of Oran, and the Army of Africa treated him as its principal interlocutor.

=== 1834–1835: Desmichels Treaty, Battle of La Macta ===
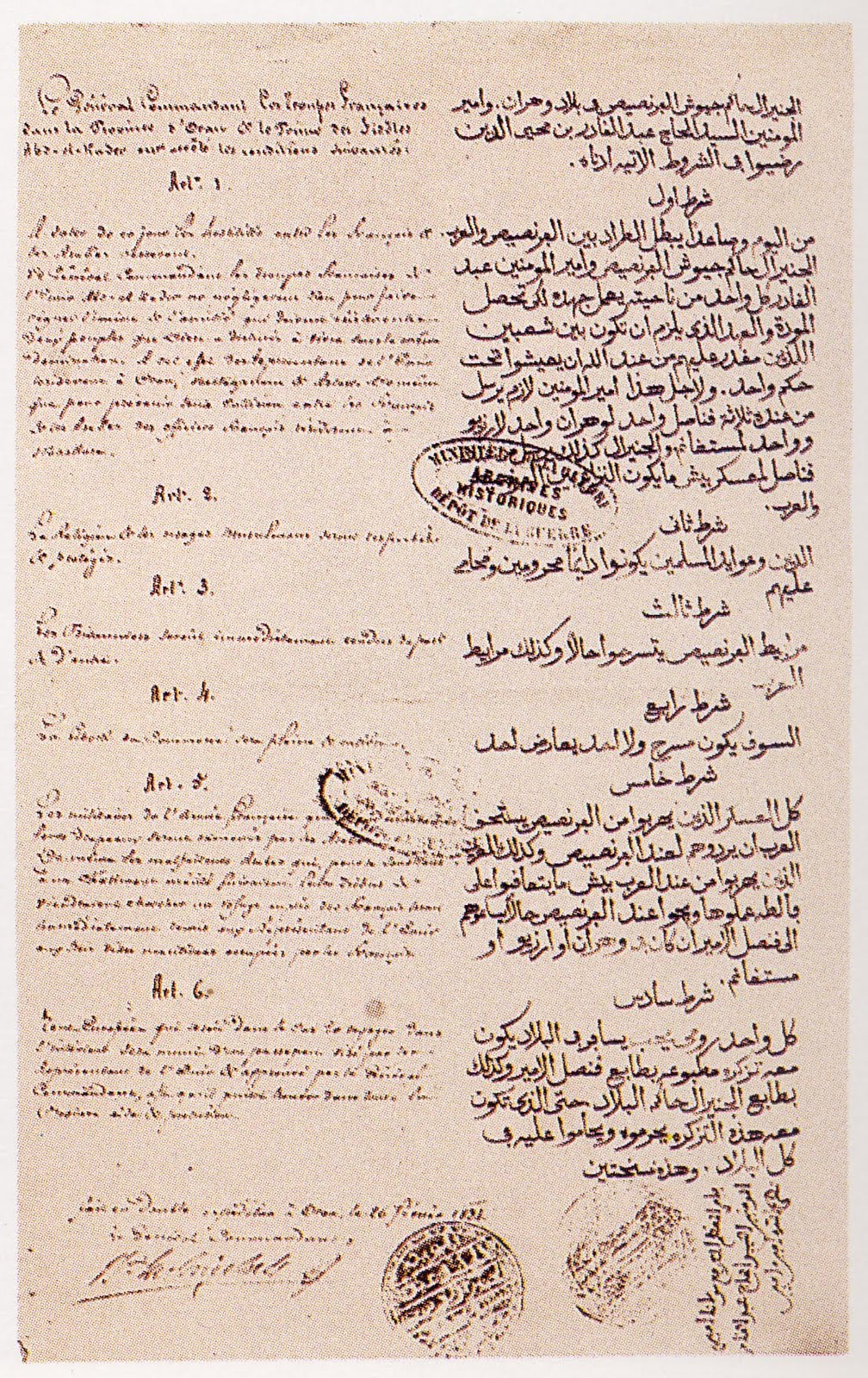
Desmichels Treaty concluded in Oran on 26 February 1834 between France and Abdelkader.

On 26 February 1834, the French commander of western Algeria, General Louis Alexis Desmichels, proposed a peace treaty to Abdelkader, who accepted it. The treaty recognised his sovereignty over the western territories, with the exception of the port cities of Oran, Mostaganem and Arzew. The treaty called for good relations between the French and the indigenous peoples, respect for religions, the immediate exchange of prisoners, freedom of trade, and so on. For the French, this was a way of establishing peace in the region while also confining Abdelkader to the west. His status as a signatory helped strengthen his position in the eyes of the Berbers and of the French. In order to enable the emir to subdue the rebellious tribes, the general helped him to train a regular infantry force and supplied him with weapons.

Using this treaty as a start, the Emir imposed his rule on the tribes of the Chelif, and captured the towns of Miliana and Médéa. The French high command, unhappy with what they now saw as the unfavourable terms of the Desmichels Treaty, recalled General Desmichels and replaced him with General Camille Alphonse Trézel, which caused a resumption of hostilities. Abdelkader's tribal warriors met the French forces in June 1835 at the Battle of Macta, where the French were defeated. France responded by stepping up hostilities, and under new commanders it captured Mascara in December 1835 and Tlemcen in January 1836.

=== 1836–1837: General Bugeaud, Treaty of Tafna ===
In the spring of 1836, fresh reinforcements arrived to bolster the Army of Africa, now led by General Thomas Robert Bugeaud. The first clash between the two armies took place in July 1836 on the banks of the Sikkak; it ended in a clear French victory. But political opinion in France was becoming ambivalent towards Algeria, and with a desire to end the conflict, General Bugeaud was "authorized to use all means to induce Abd el-Kader to make overtures of peace". The result, after protracted negotiations, was the Treaty of Tafna, signed on 30 May 1837. This treaty gave even more control of interior portions of Algeria to Abdelkader, who won control of all of Oran Province, the neighbouring province of Titteri, and even beyond.

Following a failed initial attempt in November 1836, the French army, under the command of Marshal Bertrand Clauzel, captured Constantine in October 1837—the last Ottoman stronghold of the Regency—forcing Ahmed Bey into exile. Two years later, he surrendered to the French.

Both his military strategy and the peace treaties cemented Abdelkader’s reputation, and his titles of Commander of the Believers and Sultan —albeit against his will— were confirmed by the treaties, which strengthened his authority over territories under his control, without even having to pay tribute to the French. In his correspondence with the Sultan of Morocco, he used only the title of emir so as not to upset the monarch, who supported him.

Both allies and enemies of the time noted Abdelkader’s philosophical and theological erudition; in times of peace, he would never leave his library. He demonstrated political and military leadership, was known for his chivalrous spirit, and acted as a competent administrator and persuasive orator. His fervent faith in the doctrines of Islam was unquestioned.

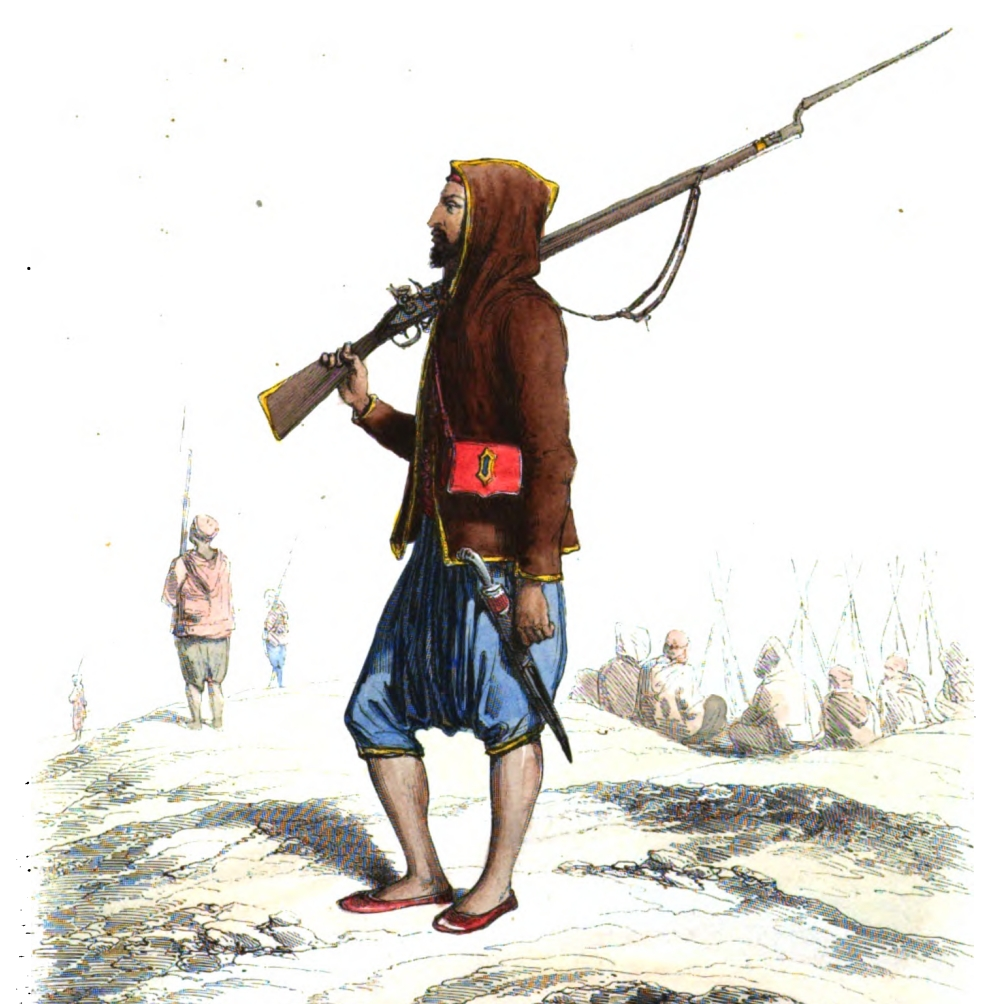
Infantryman of Abdelkader

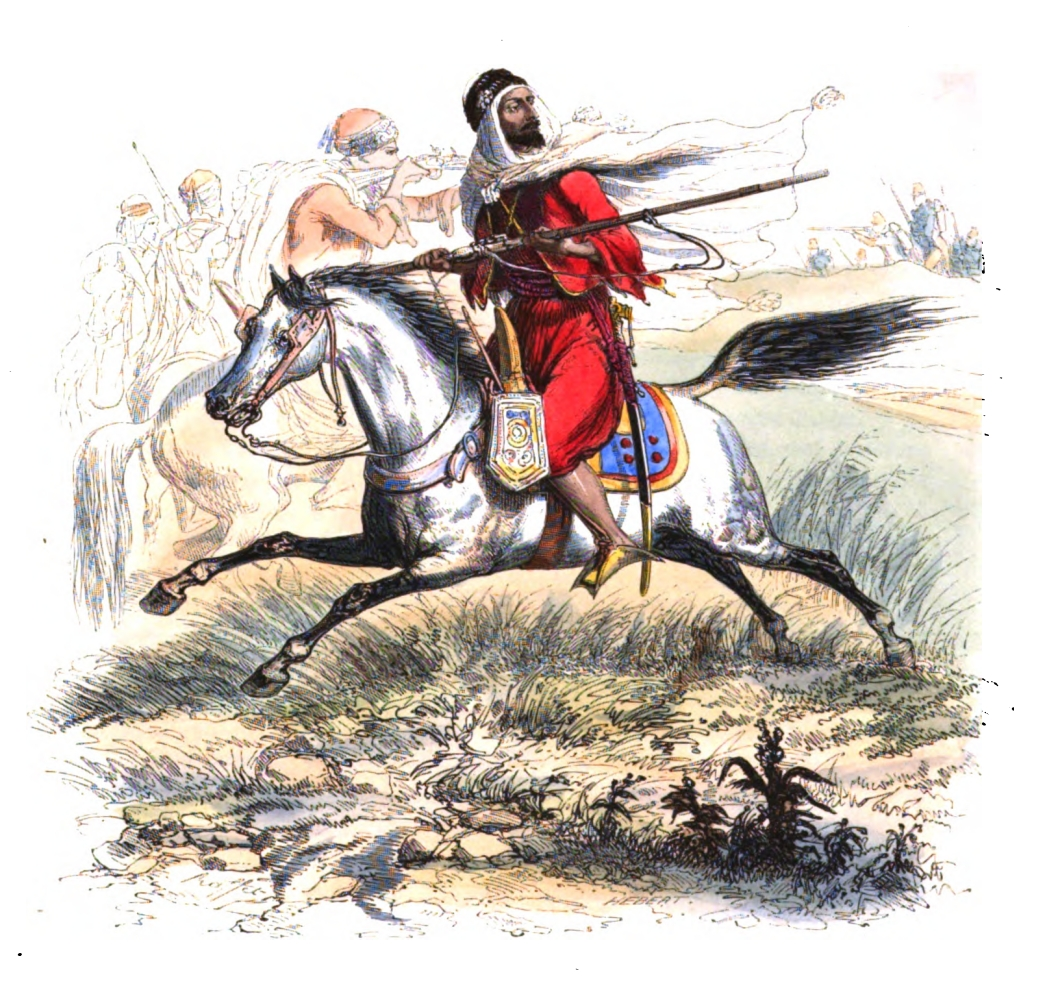
Cavalier of Abdelkader

=== 1837–1839: Period of peace and state formation ===
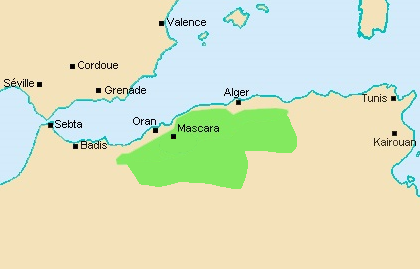
Emirate of Abdelkader between 1836 and 1839.

The period of peace following the Treaty of Tafna benefited both sides, and Abdelkader took the opportunity to consolidate the state under his control, with a capital in Tagdemt. He played down his political power, however, repeatedly declining the title of sultan and striving to concentrate on his spiritual authority, through obtaining a fatwa which gave him firm authority to call for jihad and make tax avoidance a "crime against the Muslim community as a whole". The state he created was broadly theocratic, and most positions of authority were held by members of the religious aristocracy. He divided his territory into eight regions (khalifaliks), each governed by a caliph (khalifa); each region was itself divided into districts, headed by aghas; each district comprised several tribes, each of which was led by a qaid.

Another aspect of Abdelkader that helped him lead his fledgling nation was his ability to find and use good talent regardless of its nationality or religion. He would employ Jews and Christians on his way to building his nation. One of these was Léon Roches, his secretary and translator from late 1837 to late 1839. The emir provided each khalifalik with tailors, armourers and saddlers, and established a small cannon foundry in Tlemcen. He placed, in the interior towns, arsenals, workshops, and warehouses, where he stored agricultural products to be sold for arms purchases. He established numerous schools where children were taught the fundamentals of Islam, as well as how to read and write. He set up courts of justice and appointed judges (qadis). He minted his own currency, the muhammadiyya (or "boudjou of Abdelkader"), in reference to the prophet of Islam.

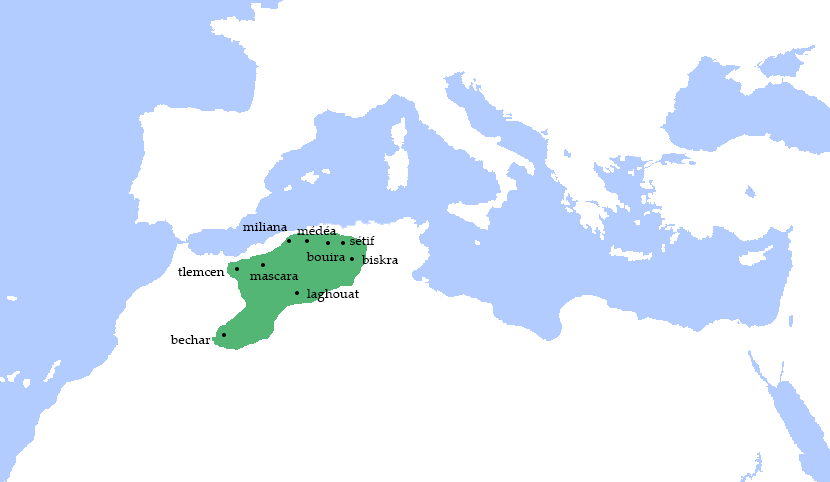
Emirate of Abdelkader at its greatest extent.

On the one hand, to protect his resources, his means of production and the property of allied tribes from further French aggression, and on the other hand, to keep the restless tribes of the Sahara at bay, the Emir had fortifications built along the southern edge of the Tell: Sebdou, south of Tlemcen; Saïda, south of Mascara; Tagdemt, south-east of that city; Taza, south of Miliana; Boghar, south of Médéa; Bel-Kheroub, south-east of Algiers; and Biskra, south-west of Constantine.

Since the start of the jihad, dissension amongst the population has forced the Emir or his representatives to intervene. One of the main centres of unrest was Aïn Madhi, the stronghold of the influential Tijaniyyah brotherhood. After a six-month siege, which began in June 1838, Abdelkader’s troops captured the town.

By the end of 1838 —aged around 31—, his rule extended east to Kabylie, and south to Biskra, the gateway to the desert, and westwards to the Moroccan border. He commanded a standing force of 8,000 infantrymen, 2,000 cavalrymen and 240 artillerymen, supported by volunteers from the local tribes.

=== 1839–1841: Resumption of hostilities ===
The peace ended when Prince Ferdinand Philippe, Duke of Orléans, the eldest son of King Louis Philippe I, and Governor-General Sylvain Charles Valée, ignoring the terms of the Treaty of Tafna, headed an expeditionary force that breached the Iron Gates between Constantine and Algiers on 28 October 1839, and entered territory under the Emir’s administration. Consequently, on 20 November, urged on by his caliphs, Abdelkader attacked the French in the partially colonised Mitidja plain and routed them. In response the French officially declared war, but the fighting bogged down until General Bugeaud returned to Algeria, this time as governor-general, in February 1841, followed by 25,000 new soldiers, bringing the African Army’s strength to 85,000 men. Abdelkader was originally encouraged to hear that Bugeaud, the promoter of the Treaty of Tafna, was returning. But this time Bugeaud's strategy would be radically different: his approach was one of annihilation through a scorched-earth policy, with the conquest of Algeria as the endgame.

At the beginning, the struggle went in the Emir's favour; however, the resistance was soon put down by Bugeaud, who adapted to the guerrilla tactics employed by Abdelkader, who would strike fast and disappear into the terrain with light infantry. The French increased their mobility. In order to punish a population devoted to the Emir, with the aim of forcing it to rally to France out of necessity, the French army raided the area, set fire to villages and crops, ravaged agricultural areas, and seized livestock. By 1841, the Emir's fortifications had all but been destroyed, and he was forced to wander the interior of the Oran Province.

=== 1842–1844: Capture of the smala, retreat to Morocco ===
In 1842, besieged on all sides and with his financial resources at an all-time low, he saw many of his followers forced, often for the sake of their survival, to submit to the French. He lost control of Tlemcen and, in his absence, his itinerant capital — his smala, consisting of several thousand tents housing tens of thousands of inhabitants — was discovered on 16 May 1843 at Taguine and ransacked by the troops of the Duke of Aumale, the fifth son of Louis Philippe I. (Note: According to the emir, his smala comprised a dozen tribes, some 60,000 men, women and children, and countless horses and herds. It stretched for dozens of kilometers from Taguine towards Djebel Amour. The tents of the Emir and his family were surrounded by those of 300 to 400 infantrymen, followed by those of the Hachems of Ghris. All the trades necessary for the jihad were present: armourers, saddlers, tailors, etc. There was a large market there frequented by the Arabs of the region. When the inhabitants of the smala camped near Taguine saw the Duke of Aumale’s spahis arriving, clad in their red burnous, they mistook them for the Emir’s horsemen, who were also dressed in red. The joy of their return turned to terror, but it was too late to defend themselves. According to the Duke of Aumale, there were 300 Algerian casualties and 3,500 prisoners.)

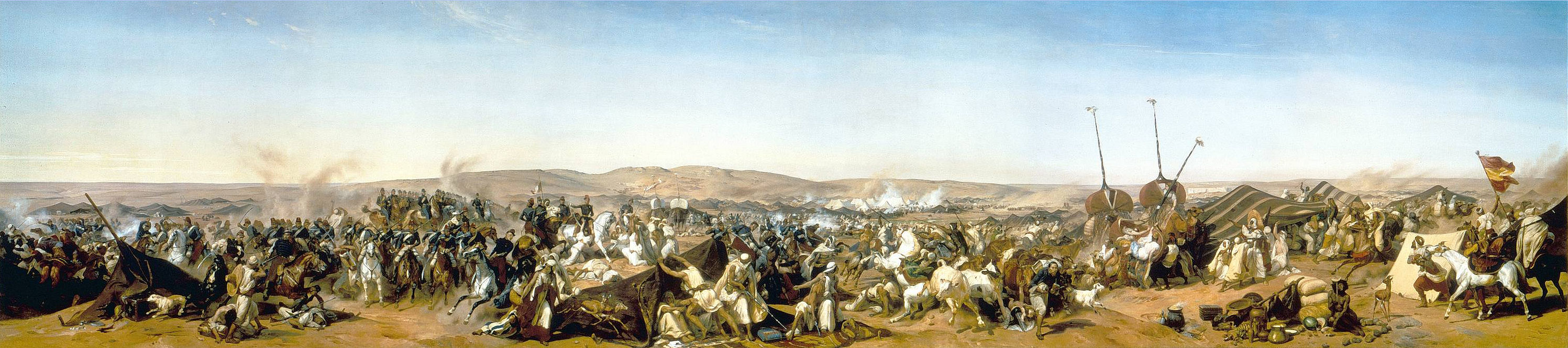
The Capture of the Smala of Abd el-Kader in Taguine on 16 May 1843. Horace Vernet, 1844, oil on canvas, 26 x 4,9 meters. Commissionned by King Louis Philippe I. Palace of Versailles.

This event was followed by further significant setbacks for the Algerian side and, by the end of the year, Abdelkader withdrew with his troops and supporters to Morocco, which was ruled by Sultan Abd al-Rahman ben Hicham, who supported him. Infuriated in particular by Morocco’s support for their enemy, the French bombarded, in August 1844, Tangier, then Mogador, whilst Bugeaud, promoted to marshal, crossed the border with 11,000 men and defeated the Moroccan army at the Battle of Isly (14 August 1844). Under the Treaty of Tangier, signed on 10 September 1844, France forced Abd al-Rahman to banish the Emir from his territory.

=== 1845–1846: War crimes ===
In June 1845, more than 500 men, women and children from the Oulad Riah tribe, pursued by Lieutenant-Colonel Aimable Pélissier’s column, took refuge in a cave in the Dahra Range. After unsuccessfully ordering them to surrender, the soldiers blocked the entrance with branches, which they set alight, filling the cave with smoke and using up the oxygen; only 40 of them survived. This smoking out had been preceded a year earlier by one carried out by Colonel Louis-Eugène Cavaignac against members of the Sbehas tribe, who were accused of murdering settlers and French-appointed qaids; hunted down, they took refuge in a cave where they all perished. In August 1845, Colonel Jacques Leroy de Saint-Arnaud discovered 500 Algerians hiding in a cave; as they refused to surrender, he had the entrance blocked until they all perished.

On 23–25 September 1845, Abdelkader defeated the French at the Battle of Sidi-Brahim, taking around a hundred prisoners. A few days later, at Aïn Témouchent, he captured without a fight a French column of 200 soldiers who had been called up as reinforcements. Continuing the offensive, the Emir reached the Hautes Plaines and asked a lieutenant to escort these 300 prisoners to his deira (former smala), his mobile capital encamped in Moroccan territory on the banks of the Moulouya River, near the Algerian border. Exposed to both French and Moroccan troops and running short of food, the deira, comprising some 200 tents, regarded these prisoners as an excessive burden. Abdelkader made repeated proposals for an exchange, but Bugeaud refused, banking on a release which he believed the Emir would be compelled to grant in order to alleviate the hardships of his community. But on 24 April 1846, whilst Abdelkader was fighting 300 miles away, one of his lieutenants, after consulting with the other camp authorities, ordered their execution. He spared 11 officers, confident that their presence would prevent French reprisals. The Emir heard the news, but due to the fighting, he did not return to his deira until three months later. He proposed to Bugeaud that the 11 prisoners be exchanged. As this offer came to nothing, he planned to propose their release in exchange for a ransom, but his officers believed that their own safety depended on the hostages’ continued presence and would only agree to his plan on condition that the Emir took responsibility for the crime. Abdelkader agreed and wrote to King Louis Philippe to this effect. The prisoners were returned in exchange for 33,000 francs. As far as France was concerned, the Emir had discredited himself through this massacre, even though certain authorities in the country, having cross-checked the evidence, concluded that he was innocent.

=== 1847: End of the resistance ===
In January 1847, in order to drive the Algerians from his territory, Sultan Abd al-Rahman ordered the Moroccan tribes neighbouring Abdelkader’s deira to stop selling it food, and to harass those who attempted to obtain supplies. Abdelkader endured this situation for six months, then went on the offensive, which had the effect of rallying several Moroccan tribes to his cause and facilitating the supply of his camp.

Following this failure by the Moroccans, an assassin was sent to kill Emir Abdelkader. One evening, while he was reading, a tall, burly man entered his tent, a dagger in his hand. Abdelkader looked up, and the man immediately threw himself at his feet: "I was going to strike you, but the sight of you disarmed me. I thought I saw the halo of the Prophet around your head."

In July 1847, the nephew of Abd al-Rahman, Moulay Hashim, was sent along with the governor of the Rif, El Hamra, in command of a Moroccan army to attack the Emir and his deira in Oued Aslaf. The Moroccans were defeated, El Hamra killed, and Moulay Hashim had barely escaped with his life. The Emir then sent his deputy Bou Hamedi to negotiate with the Moroccan sultan. Abd al-Rahman refused to see him, threw him in prison, where he died of poisoning.

Early December, two of Abd al-Rahman’s sons, commanding 50,000 soldiers, were defeated at the Battle of Agueddin by Abdelkader’s army, consisting of 1,200 cavalrymen and 800 infantrymen. Soon after, Abdelkader made the choice to withdraw from Morocco. Whilst he and his men were repelling a new battalion of Moroccan soldiers sent in his pursuit, his deira, comprising some 5,000 people, managed to safely cross the River Kis, and enter French territory.

By the end of 1847, Abdelkader deemed the situation hopeless and, preferring to fall into the hands of those who had fought him—whom he considered loyal—rather than into those of Moulay Abd al-Rahman, who had betrayed him, on 22 December he proposed to General Louis Juchault de Lamoricière the laying down of his arms in exchange for a safe conduct to Alexandria or Acre. His proposal was accepted, and the following day, his surrender and its counterpart were officialized by the new Governor-General, the Duke of Aumale, to whom Abdelkader symbolically handed over his warhorse. His British biographer Charles Henry Churchill later wrote: "His military career had ended. Hitherto his life had been devoted to God and his country. Henceforth it was to be devoted to God alone".

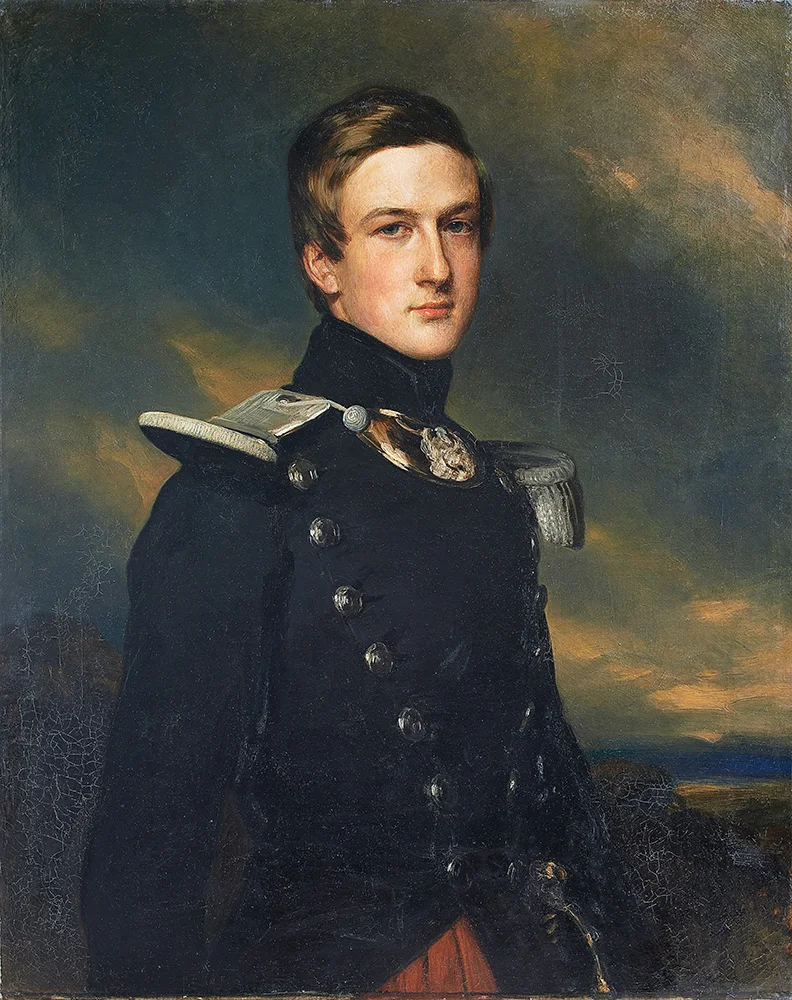
Prince Henri, Duke of Aumale (1840)

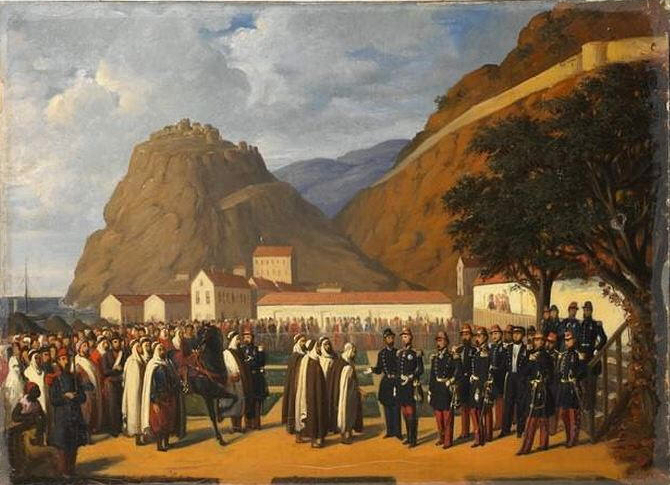
Surrender of Abdelkader, painted by Augustin Regis

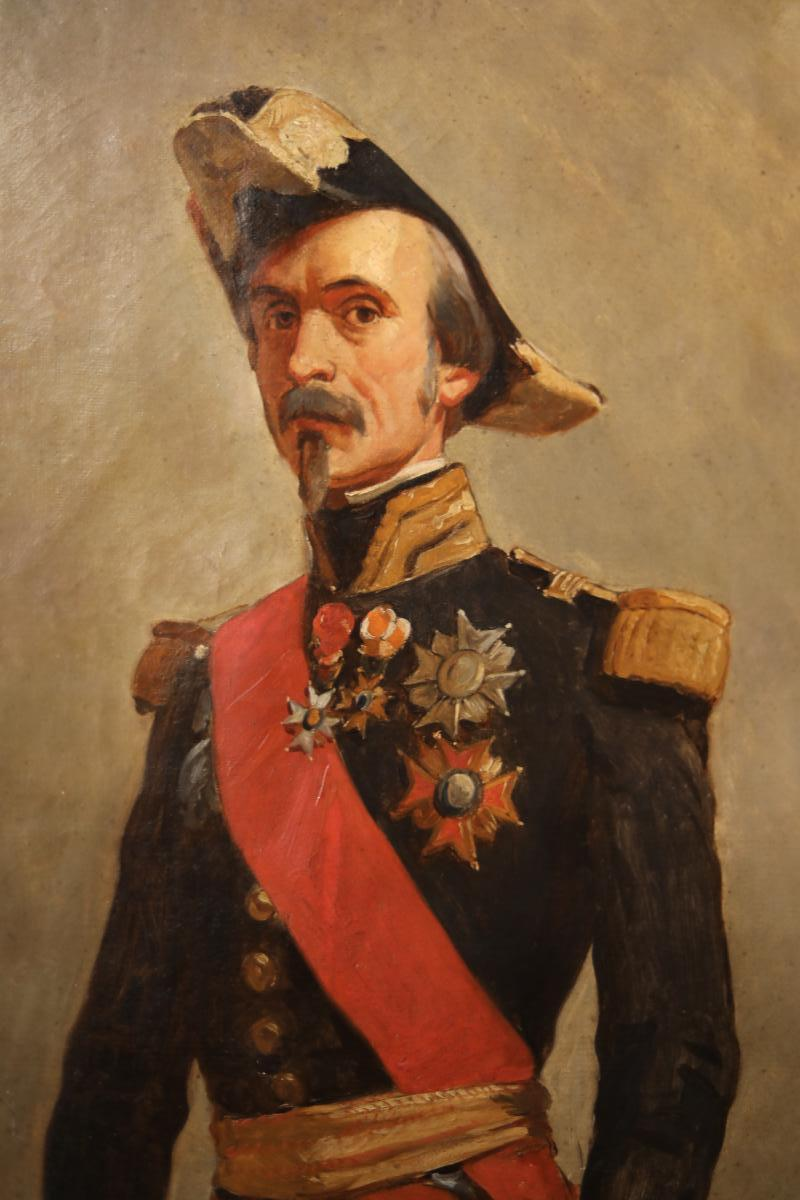
Louis de Lamoricière, painted by Horace Vernet (1848)

== 1848-1852: Imprisonment in France ==
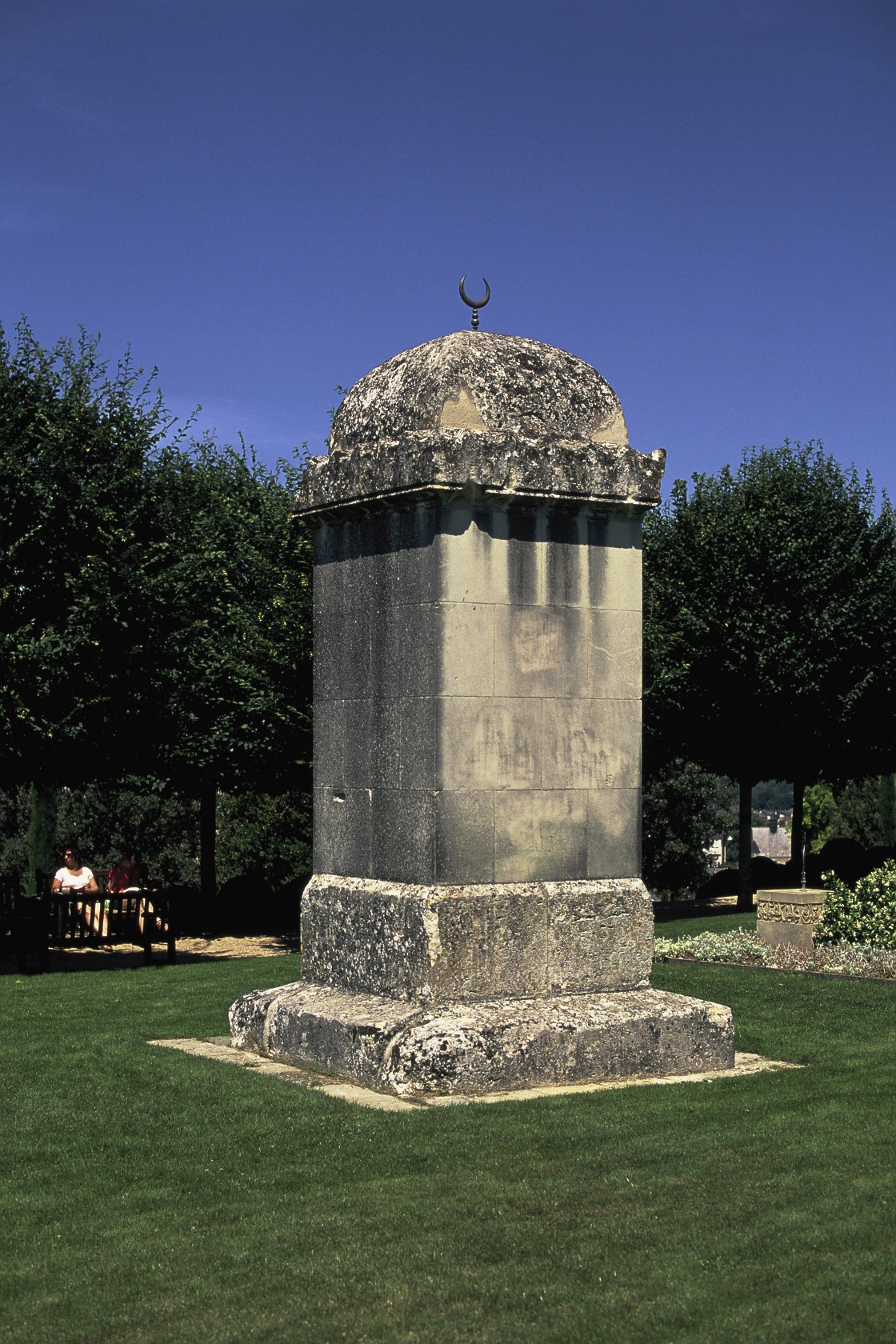
Tomb at the Château d'Amboise of 25 members of Abdelkader's retinue who died during their imprisonment, including one of his wives, one of his brothers, and two of his children.

The French government refused to honour Lamoricière's and the Duke's promise: the ship carrying Abdelkader and his entourage —nearly a hundred people— headed for Toulon. The Algerians were held there for four months at Fort Lamalgue, then for six months at the Château de Pau, before being transferred to the Château d'Amboise in November 1848. Damp conditions in the castle led to deteriorating health as well as morale in the Emir and his followers, and his fate became something of a cause célèbre in certain circles. Several high-profile figures, including Émile de Girardin and Victor Hugo, called for greater clarification over the Emir's situation; future prime minister Émile Ollivier carried out a public opinion campaign to raise awareness over his fate. There was also international pressure. Lord Londonderry visited Abdelkader in Amboise and subsequently wrote to then-President Louis-Napoléon Bonaparte (whom he had known during the latter's exile in England) to appeal for the Emir's release.

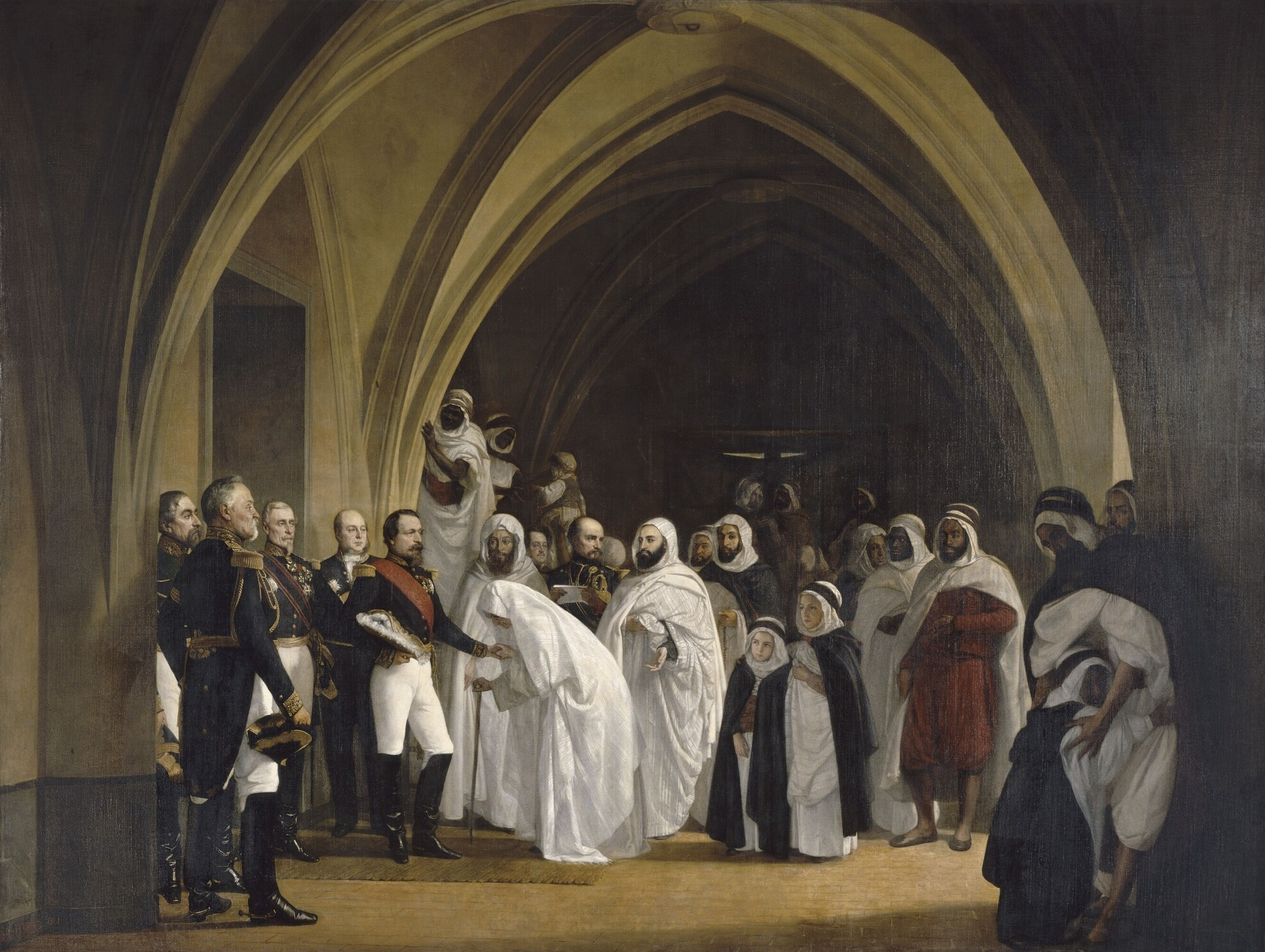
Louis-Napoléon Bonaparte grants freedom to Emir Abd el-Kader (1852). His mother, bent with age, takes the prince's hand. Oil on canvas by Ange Tissier, 1861.

Louis-Napoleon Bonaparte was a relatively new president, having come to power in the Revolution of 1848 while Abdelkader was already imprisoned. He was keen to make a break with several policies of the previous regime, and Abdelkader's cause was one of them. Eventually, on 16 October 1852, the Emir was released by the President. Abdelkader remained in France for a further two months. On two occasions he visited Paris, where he met his liberator once again; the first time at the Château de Saint-Cloud, where the Emir, of his own free will, swore an oath never again to stir up unrest in Algeria; the second time, on 2 December, at the Tuileries Palace, where Louis-Napoléon was proclaimed emperor under the name of Napoleon III. Two weeks later, Abdelkader and his entourage were about to leave the country for Bursa (now in Turkey), when the Emir spotted his future biographer, Alexandre Bellemare, and asked him to refute, in writing and in speech, the belief still held by many French people that he was responsible for the massacre of the French prisoners on 24 April 1846. France granted him an annual pension of 100,000 francs.

== 1853-1883: Exile in the Near East ==
Shortly after settling in Bursa, Abdelkader received a valuable sabre with the following words engraved on the scabbard: ‘Sultan Napoleon III to Emir Abd-el-Kader-ben-Mahhi-ed-Dīn’. As he had promised in Paris, the Emir sent the emperor three Arabian horses. Surrounded by a population generally hostile towards Arabs, whose language and customs were alien to him, and despite close ties with scholars and religious leaders, his situation in Bursa weighed heavily on him, though he dared not inform the emperor. The opportunity, however, arose in early 1855, when a violent earthquake devastated the city, prompting the Emir to travel to Paris to seek, and receive, the emperor’s permission to settle in Damascus. Before leaving Paris, he visited the Paris Exposition and presented the president of the Asiatic Society with the Arabic manuscript of his Rappel à l’intelligent, avis à l’indifférent (Reminder to the intelligent, notice to the indifferent). This manuscript was translated into French and published in 1858, then retranslated into French in 1977 under the title Lettre aux Français (Letter to the French). On his return to the East, he settled in Damascus (December 1855), in the Amara District, with his family and relatives, 200 people in all, whilst 500 other compatriots had been living there since 1847 following their submission to France. Due to new arrivals, the Algerians soon formed a large community, including more than a thousand former infantrymen and cavalrymen.

=== 1860: Massacre of Christians in Damascus ===
In February 1856, the Sultan of the Ottoman Empire Abdülmecid I, under pressure from his European allies, signed the Hatt-i Hümayun. This decree abolished the dominance of Muslims and Druze over non-Muslim populations, who were thus granted the same civil, professional, political, judicial and military rights as Muslims. In Lebanon, an Ottoman territory, this reform fuelled rivalries between Druze and Maronite Christians, with the former feeling belittled and the latter holding their heads high with a certain ostentation. The Ottoman authorities, under pressure from Muslims, did nothing—quite the contrary—to contain the nascent conflict. The conflict reached its peak in June 1860, when around 10,000 Christians were massacred by the Druze and around 2,000 Druze by the Christians. Between 3,000 and 6,000 (sources vary) Christians of all denominations sought refuge in Damascus, the capital of Ottoman Syria.

In Damascus, the Lebanese conflict had exacerbated anti-Christian sentiment. (Note: The Christian community in Damascus comprised Greek Orthodox, Syriac Orthodox, Melkites (Greek Catholics), Armenians, Maronites, and others.) Muslim dignitaries, alongside Abdelkader’s companions, attempted to ease tensions, whilst the Emir warned the French consul of an imminent risk of unrest and requested weapons, which he was granted. Against this agitated backdrop, a group of Muslim teenagers committed acts of vandalism directed at Christian symbols. Arrested by Ottoman guards, the latter were attacked by a group of young fanatics, who stirred up the crowds.

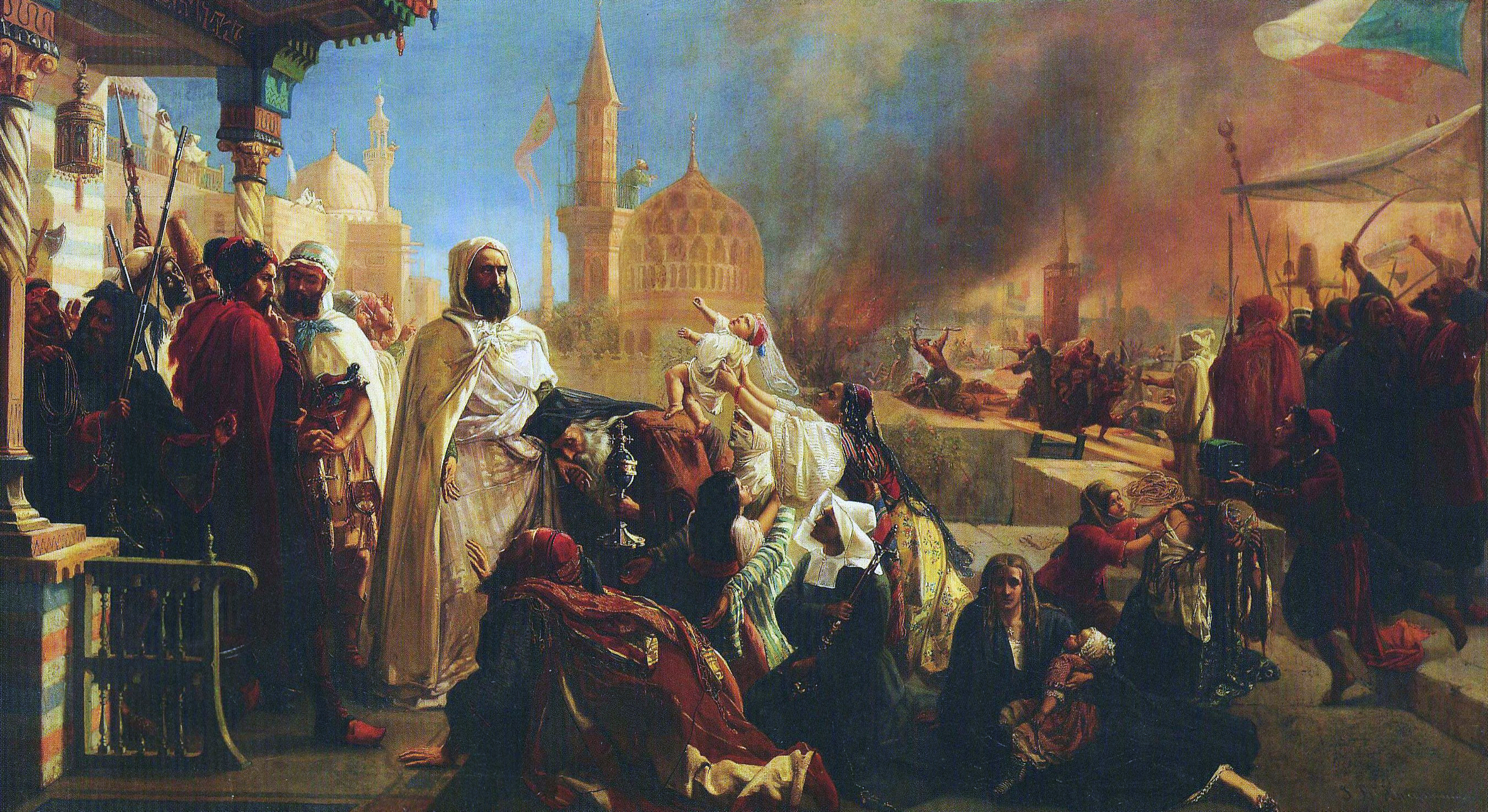
Abdelkader saving Christians during the Druze/Christian strife of 1860. Painting by Jan-Baptist Huysmans.

From 9 July onwards, a majority of Druze, but also Kurdish militiamen and other Muslims –tens of thousands of men in total– poured in from all directions and attacked the Christian quarter, massacring men, women and children, and looting and setting fire to houses. The soldiers of the Pasha were unable to quell the riot; some even joined the mob. Abdelkader and his comrades-in-arms swept through the neighbourhood, urging the survivors to take refuge in his home and in those of his compatriots, thereby saving thousands of lives. Among them were the heads of several foreign consulates as well as the Daughters of Charity and the Lazarists, along with the 400 children in the care of these two religious orders. During a lull, the Emir spread the word throughout the city that anyone who brought him a living Christian would receive 50 piastres. The lure of money enabled him to save a large number of additional Christians. They all finally found refuge in the citadel, which the Pasha, ashamed of his role, agreed to make available to them. Accounts of the death toll vary widely: between 3,000 and 15,000.

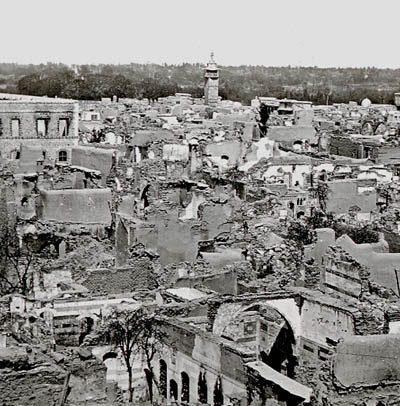
Houses in the Christian quarter of Damascus following the events of July 1860.

A French doctor reports:

[W]e were in consternation, all of us quite convinced that our last hour had arrived [...]. In that expectation of death, in those indescribable moments of anguish, heaven, however, sent us a savior! Abd el-Kader appeared, surrounded by his Algerians, around forty of them. He was on horseback and without arms: his handsome figure calm and imposing made a strange contrast with the noise and disorder that reigned everywhere.

— "Le Siècle", newspaper, (2 August 1869)

Reports coming out of Syria as the rioting subsided stressed the prominent role of Abdelkader, and considerable international recognition followed. The French government increased his pension to 150,000 francs and presented him with the grand cross of the Order of the Legion of Honour. He also received the grand cross of the Order of the Redeemer from the Kingdom of Greece, the grand cross of the Order of Saints Maurice and Lazarus from the Kingdom of Italy, the grand cross of the Order of the White Eagle from the Russian Empire, the medal of knighthood of the Order of the Black Eagle from the Kingdom of Prussia, the First Class Medjidie from the Ottoman Empire, the grand cross of the Order of Pope Pius IX from the Vatican, and a Blazing Star from the Masonic obedience Grand Orient de France. Abraham Lincoln sent him a pair of gold-inlaid pistols and Great Britain sent him a likewise gold-inlaid hunting rifle.

In France, the episode represented the culmination of a remarkable turnaround, from being considered as an enemy of France during the first half of the 19th century, to becoming a "friend of France" after having intervened in favour of persecuted Christians. "What I did," the Emir replied to Imam Shamil, "I had to do in the name of Islam and respect for human rights".

=== Last decades ===
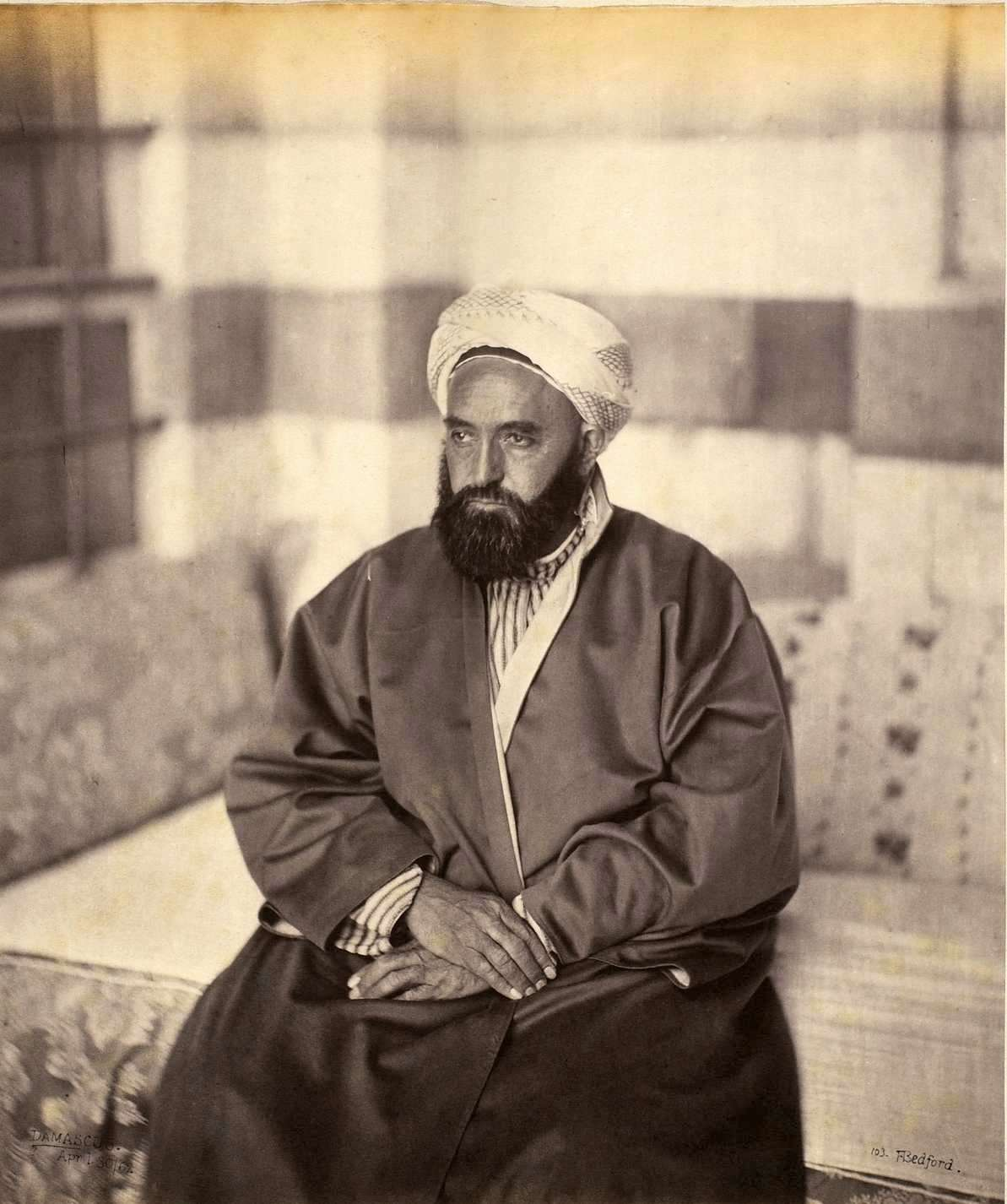
Abdelkader in Damascus ca. 1862

When he has no other commitments, Abdelkader devotes his day to his religious and spiritual vocation. According to his British biographer Charles Henry Churchill, who knew him well in Bursa and Damascus, the Emir rises two hours before sunrise to meditate and pray at home and at the mosque, has breakfast, then works in his office until midday. He then goes to the mosque for the midday prayer (dhuhr), followed by three hours of religious instruction for his group of pupils. After the afternoon prayer (asr), he returns home and spends a good hour with his eight sons. He has dinner and then returns to the mosque for the last two prayers of the day, between which he teaches again. He then spends about two hours in his study, before going to bed. Every month he distributes at least the equivalent of 4,000 francs to the needy.

In January 1863, Abdelkader left Damascus for the Hejaz. He performed the pilgrimage to Mecca, spent three months in Taif, and returned to Mecca, where he joined the Darqawi sheikh Muhammad al-Fasi al-Shadhilî. He remained there for eight months and then spent three months in Medina.

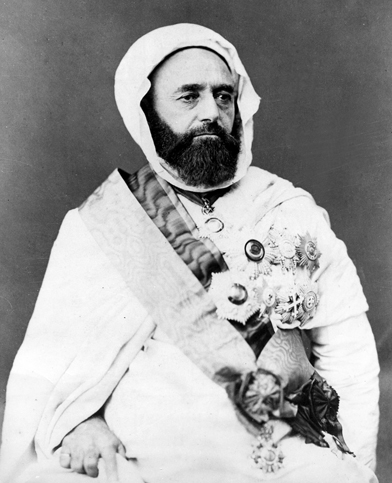
Abdelkader photographed in Paris by Étienne Carjat in 1865

On 18 June 1864, after leaving Medina to return to Damascus, Abdelkader was initiated into Freemasonry by the "Les pyramides d’Égypte" lodge in Alexandria, acting on behalf of the Parisian "Henri IV" lodge. His first contact with Freemasonry dates back to September 1860, following the rescue of the Christians of Damascus, when he was approached by Freemasons from the Henri IV lodge, affiliated to the Grand Orient de France. Keen to forge humanitarian ties, the Emir welcomed the principles and ideals of the GOF: the existence of God ("Great Architect of the Universe"), the immortality of the soul, the love of humanity, the practice of tolerance, and universal brotherhood. But already a year after his initiation —which was confirmed at the Henri IV lodge in Paris in 1865— he observed among his Masonic "brothers" a gradual erosion of belief in the existence of God and the immortality of the soul. Unable to accept this relativisation of what he regarded as immutable, he left Freemasonry. (Note: In 1877, the Grand Orient officially abolished the requirement to acknowledge the existence of God and the immortality of the soul.)

In 1865, he travelled to Constantinople, London and Paris. In 1867, on the occasion of the Paris Exposition, he returned to France at the invitation of Napoleon III.

He was invited to the opening of the Suez Canal on 17 November 1869 because of his connections with the Viceroy of Egypt, Ismail Pasha, and with Ferdinand de Lesseps, the promoter and director of the canal project, of whom he had been one of the most active supporters. That same year, whilst still in Egypt, he met Imam Shamil, whose life story —in the North Caucasus, a region coveted and subsequently annexed by the Russians—mirrored that of the Emir: Sufi, elected leader of the jihad, surrender after years of struggle, imprisonment in the occupier’s country.

=== Death and burial ===
Abdelkader died in Damascus on 26 May 1883. After receiving military honours, in the presence of his "brothers in God", the city authorities, consular representatives and a vast crowd, he was laid to rest in the mausoleum of Ibn Arabi, whose teachings he embodied six centuries later. This spiritual connection between Ibn Arabi and Abdelkader is evident both in the commentaries transcribed by his Damascene listeners and in those written in his own hand, which form the voluminous Kitab al-Mawaqif, the "Book of Halts", (Note: "For Ibn Arabi, between every maqam or manzil – every spiritual ‘station’ or ‘abode’ – and the next maqam or manzil, there is a mawqif (pl. mawaqif), a ‘halt’. The salik, the traveller who pauses at this midpoint, receives from God guidance on the rules of propriety (adab) appropriate to the maqam he is about to reach and is thus prepared to enjoy the fullness of the knowledge associated with it. Conversely, the individual who moves directly from one station to another without making this intermediate stop will, upon reaching the maqam in question, attain only a general knowledge, rather than a distinctive understanding, of the sciences specific to that new ‘station’. The progression of the sahib al-mawaqif, explains Ibn Arabi, is the most arduous, the most trying, but it is also the most fruitful. Through the very title of his book, Abd al-Kader thus suggests that this is the path God has assigned to him.") the Emir's major work that bears witness to his spiritual insight. (Note: "He [Ibn `Arabî] is our treasure from which we draw what we write, drawing it either from his spiritual form (min ruhaniyyatihi) or from what he himself has written in his works.")

In 1965, in an effort to strengthen national unity, the Algerian authorities asked the Emir’s descendants for permission to repatriate his remains. The family agreed on condition that the Emir’s great-grandson, Abder Razak Abdelkader, who was being held by the Algerian government, be released. Following his release and deportation to France, the Emir’s remains were transferred on 5 July 1966 from Damascus to the El Alia Cemetery on the outskirts of Algiers.

== Legacy ==
From the beginning of his career, Abdelkader inspired admiration not only from within Algeria, but from Europeans as well.. According to C.H. Churchill, "the generous care, the tender sympathy" he showed to his prisoners-of-war was "almost unparalleled in the annals of warfare".

In 1843, French Marshal General Soult declared that of all the men of his time whom he had known or heard of, Abdelkader was one of the three greatest; the two others, Imam Shamil and Muhammad Ali of Egypt are also Muslims, he pointed out.

The French General Bugeaud considers that:

Abdelkader was a man of genius… certainly one of the greatest figures of our time… he is an active, intelligent and swift enemy, who exerts influence over the Arab populations through the prestige conferred upon him by his genius and the nobility of the cause he defends; he is much more than an ordinary pretender; he is a kind of prophet; he is the hope of all devout Muslims.

According to French Captain de Saint-Hyppolite:

The Emir is a remarkable man. He occupies a moral position unknown to civilised Europe. He is a man detached from worldly matters, who believes himself to be inspired and to whom God has entrusted the mission of protecting his fellow believers… His ambition is not to conquer; glory is not the motive for his actions; personal interest does not guide him; the love of riches is unknown to him; he is attached to the earth only insofar as it relates to the fulfilment of the will of the Almighty, of whom he is the instrument.

Abdelkader was involved in research that went into the Bulaq Press's 1911 third edition of Ibn Arabi's Meccan Revelations. This edition was based on the Konya Manuscript, Ibn Arabi's revised version of the text, and it subsequently became standard.

The Abd el-Kader Fellowship is a US postdoctoral fellowship of The Institute for Advanced Studies in Culture at the University of Virginia.

=== Iconography ===
A medal bearing the portrait of Abdelkader was engraved by the Franco-Swiss medalist Antoine Bovy in 1862. A copy of this medal is on display at the Musée Carnavalet in Paris. The obverse portrait was inspired by Ange Tissier's 1852 painting. It is bordered by the following inscription (in French):

- El-Hadji Abd-el-Kader ould-Mahiddin / born in 1807 / near Mascara

The reverse bears the following inscription around the edge:

- Emir of North Africa · Defender of the Arab nationality · Protector of oppressed Christians · 1862

and in the field:

- The modern Jugurtha / He held one of the most powerful nations on Earth at bay / For 14 years, his story is one of our setbacks and our successes in Africa / He submits on 23 December 1847 / A magnanimous decree by Napoleon III restores his freedom on 2 December 1852 / In 1860, he pays off his moral debt to the Emperor by becoming Providence for the Christians of Syria / France, which he had fought against, loves and admires him

In Mexico, a statue of Emir Abdelkader was created by architect Luis Aguilar in May 2008.

A bust of Abdelkader was unveiled at the Red Cross headquarters in Geneva, Switzerland, in 2013.

A sculpture of the Emir by Michel Audiard was installed in the gardens of the Château d'Amboise, France, in 2022. (Note: The sculpture was vandalised on 5 February a few hours before its inauguration. The vandalism occurred amid the presidential election campaign, during which immigration and Islam have been significant issues for specific candidates.)

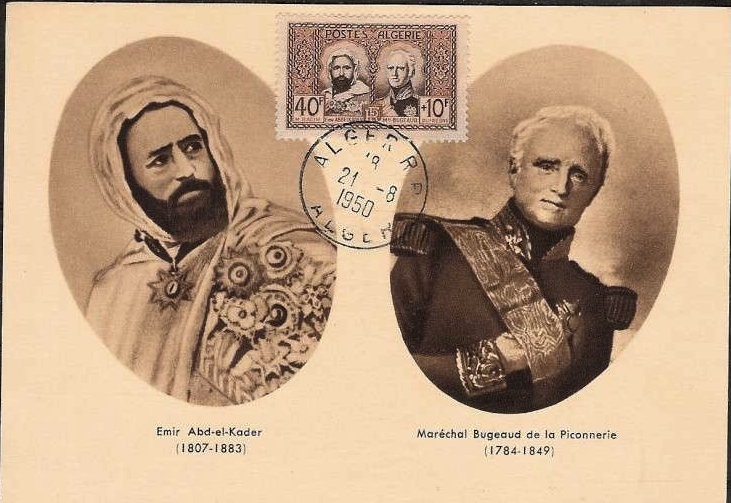
Postcard and stamp honoring Abdelkader and Bugeaud, 1950

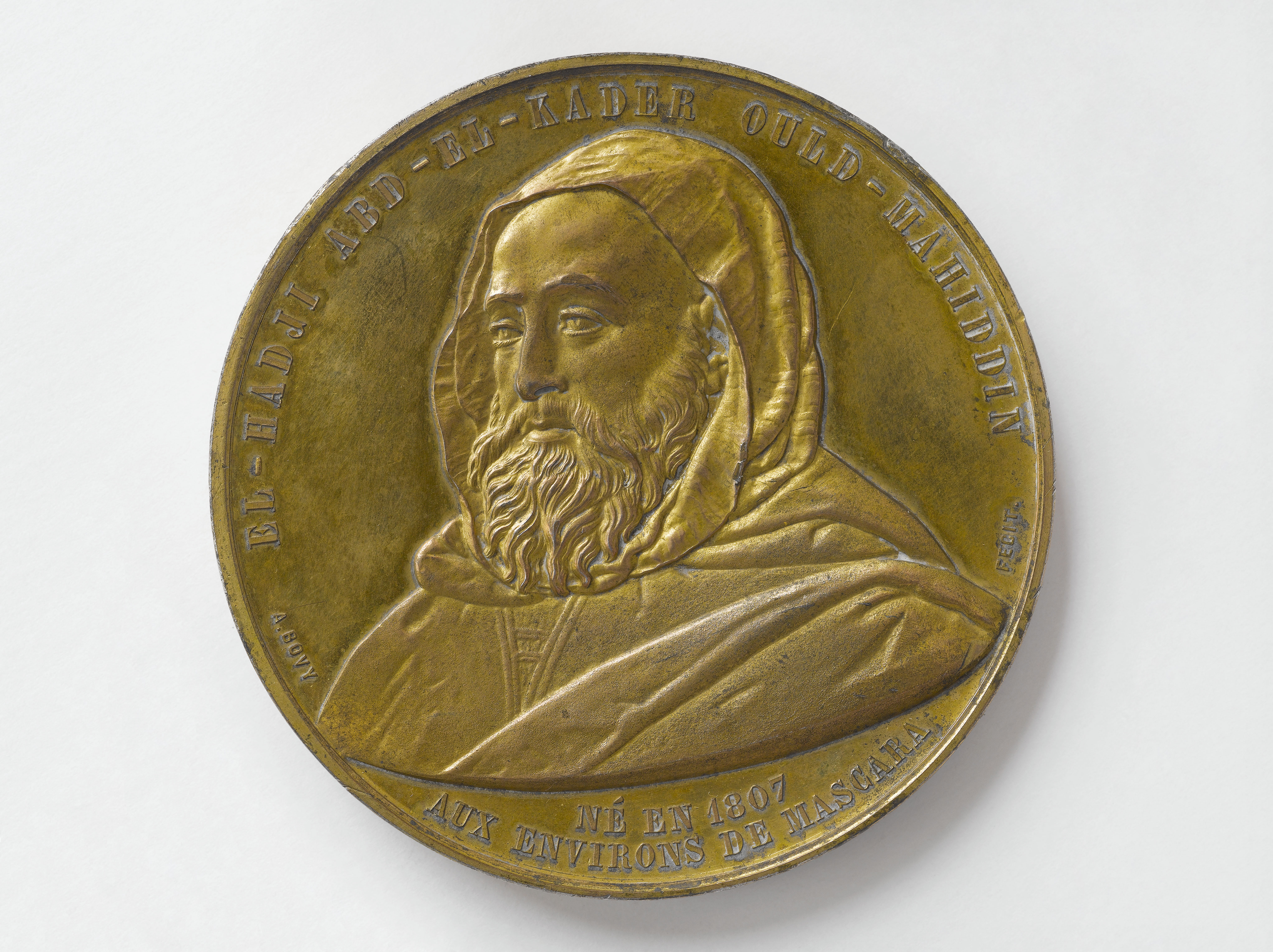
Medal engraved with the effigy of Abdelkader by Antoine Bovy, 1862

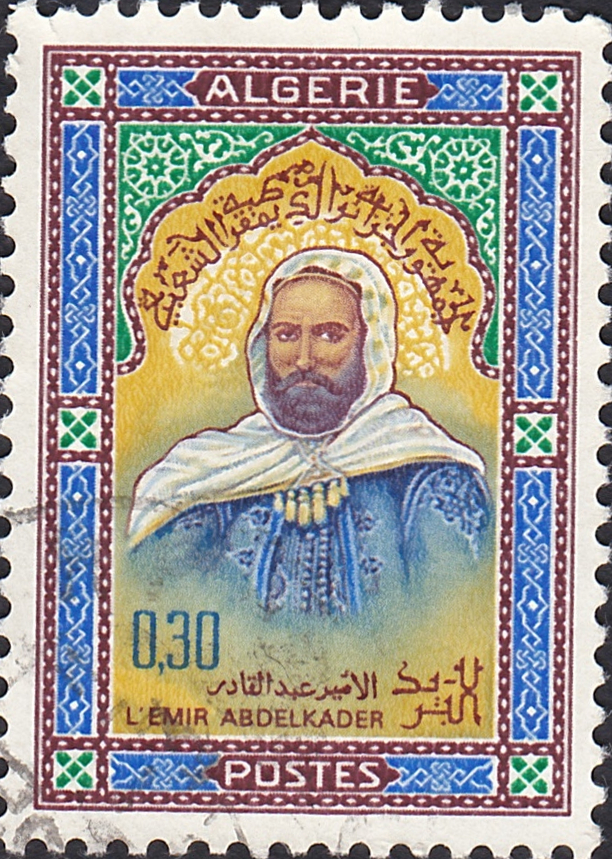
Algerian stamp featuring Abdelkader, 1966

=== Names of places and institutions ===
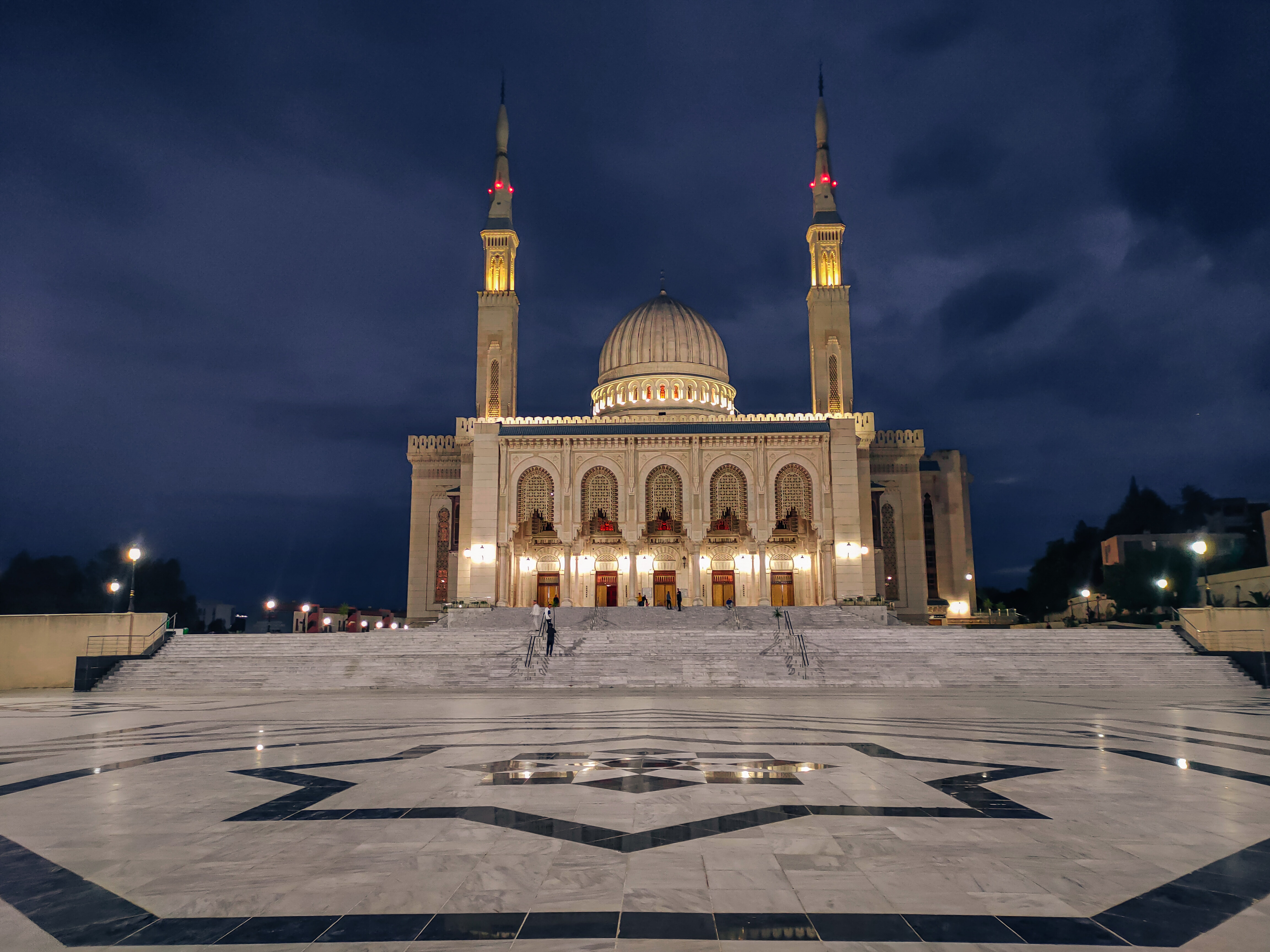
Emir Abdelkader Mosque and University of Islamic Sciences, Constantine

In Algeria, the name of Emir Abdelkader has been given to:

- the municipality of El Emir Abdelkader in Aïn Témouchent Province,
- the municipality of Emir Abdelkader in Jijel Province,
- the municipality of Bordj El Emir Abdelkader in Tissemsilt Province,
- the municipality of Zmalet El Emir Abdelkader in Tiaret Province,
- a mosque in Constantine, where the Emir Abdelkader University of Islamic Sciences is located,
- a mosque in Oran,
- a secondary school in Algiers,
- a primary school in Batna,
- his zawiya in El Guetna,
- a square in Algiers and Mascara,
- numerous streets and avenues.

In Morocco, his name has been given to the Meknes railway station, a street in Casablanca and an avenue in Rabat.

In Tunisia, to a street in Sfax.

In France, to:

- an ocean liner of the Compagnie Générale Transatlantique, launched in 1880 and dismantled in 1992,
- a square in Paris (5th arrondissement) and Lyon (7th arrondissement),
- a street in Toulon and Amboise (Note: In the gardens of the Château d'Amboise, an effigy of the emir by Michel Audiard was unveiled in February 2022.),
- a Masonic lodge of the Grande Loge de France.

In the United States, his name was used to name the town of Elkader, Iowa. The town's founders, Timothy Davis, John Thompson, and Chester Sage, were impressed by his fight against French colonial power and decided to pick his name as the name for their new settlement in 1846.

In Russia, his name has been given to a square in Moscow.

=== Relatives ===
Emir Abdelkader had ten sons and six daughters. At the beginning of the 20th century, nine sons were living in Syria, as well as five daughters, married to cousins.

His son Hachem returned to Algeria in 1892 and died in Bou Saâda in 1900, leaving two sons, one of whom, Khaled, would play an important political role in Algeria. He began his career in the French military and later entered politics in Algeria, where he actively campaigned for the country's independence. He is considered the founder of Algerian nationalism.

Abdelkader's great grandson Khaldoun Al-Hasani Al-Jazaeri was an Islamic scholar, a specialist in Maliki law, and one of the few people to have memorised all 10 readings of the Quran. He had a dental practice in Damascus. He was arrested in 2012 by Bashar al-Assad’s security forces, sentenced to death by a military court on charges of opposing the regime, and imprisoned at Sednaya Prison, where he was executed in 2015.

=== In popular media ===
In 2013, the US film director Oliver Stone announced the pending production of a filmed biopic called The Emir Abd el-Kader, to be directed by Charles Burnett. To date the film has not been made.

Documentary films in French:

- Abd el-Kader, fondateur de l’État algérien, by Salem Brahimi (96 min, 2014).
- L'Émir Abd el-Kader à Amboise, le prisonnier tant aimé, by Adyl Abdelhafidi (52 min, 2013).
- Abd el-Kader, l’exil et le divin, by Florida Sadki which recounts the captivity at the Château de Pau (52 min, 2009).
- À la recherche de l'Émir Abd El-Kader, by Mohamed Latrèche (52 min, 2004).

== Images ==
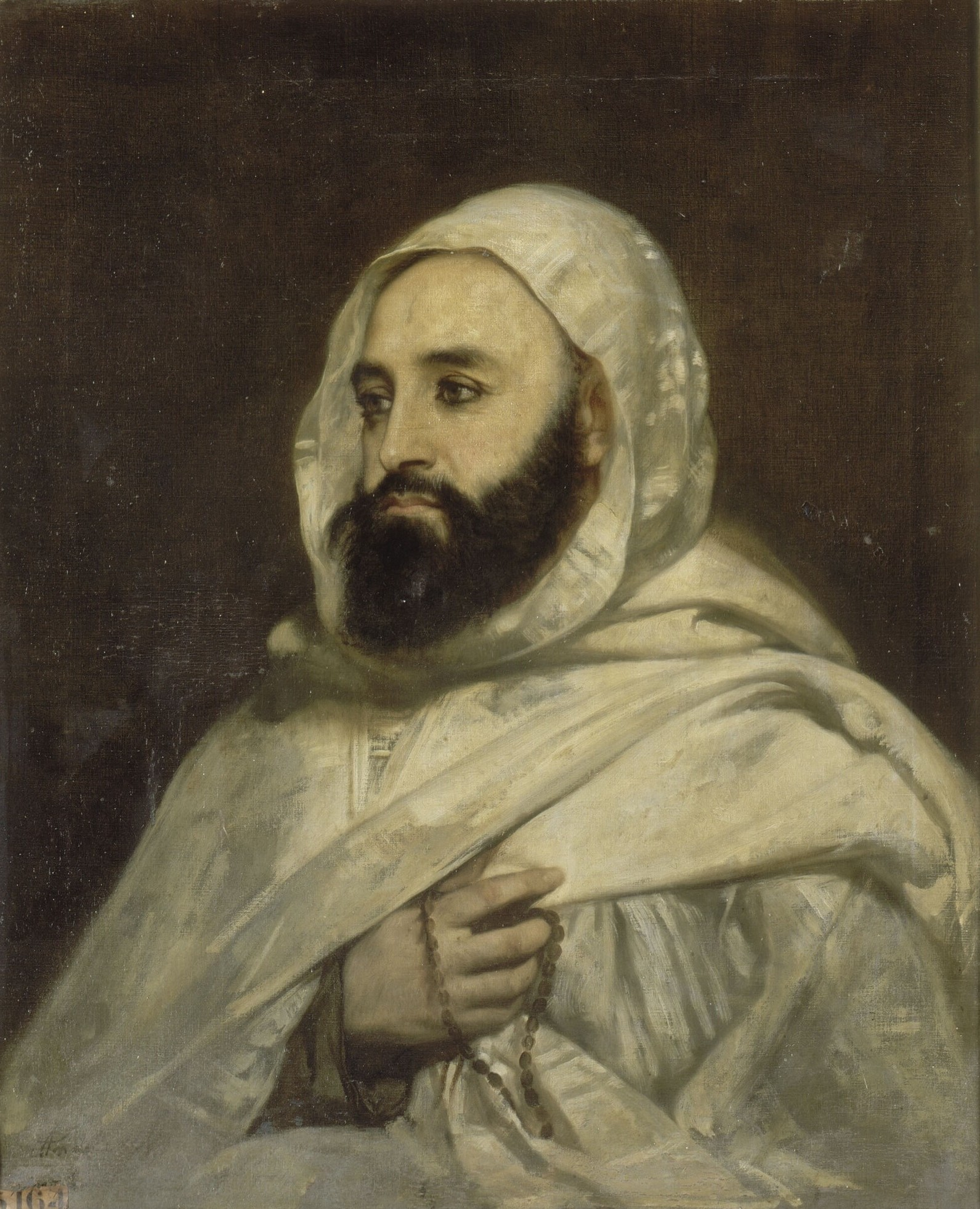
Emir Abdelkader by Tissier, 1852

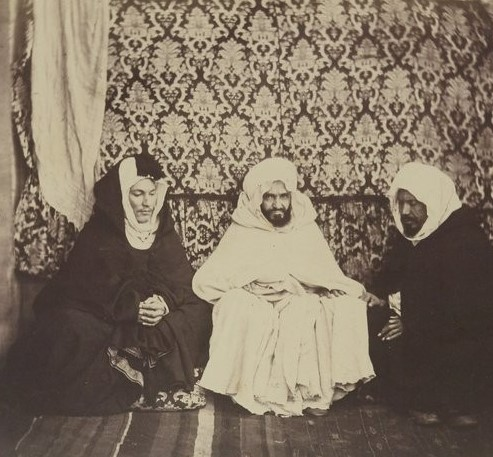
Hussein, Mustafa and Mohammed-Said, the Emir's brothers, photographed by the Abdullah brothers in 1856 in Turkey

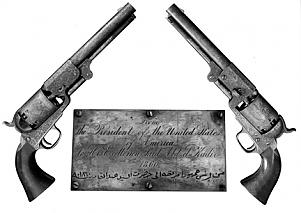
Colt Dragoon revolvers, Lincoln's gift to the Emir, 1860

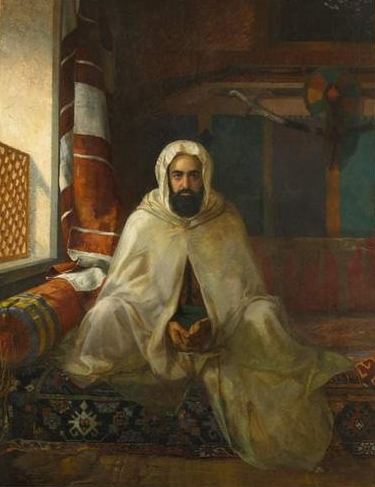
Portrait of Abd el-Kader by Stanisław Chlebowski, 1864

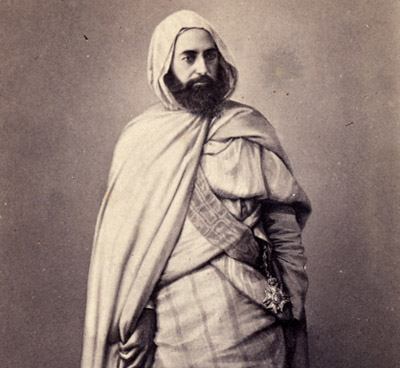
Emir Abdelkader photographed in Paris by Mayer & Pierson, probably in 1865

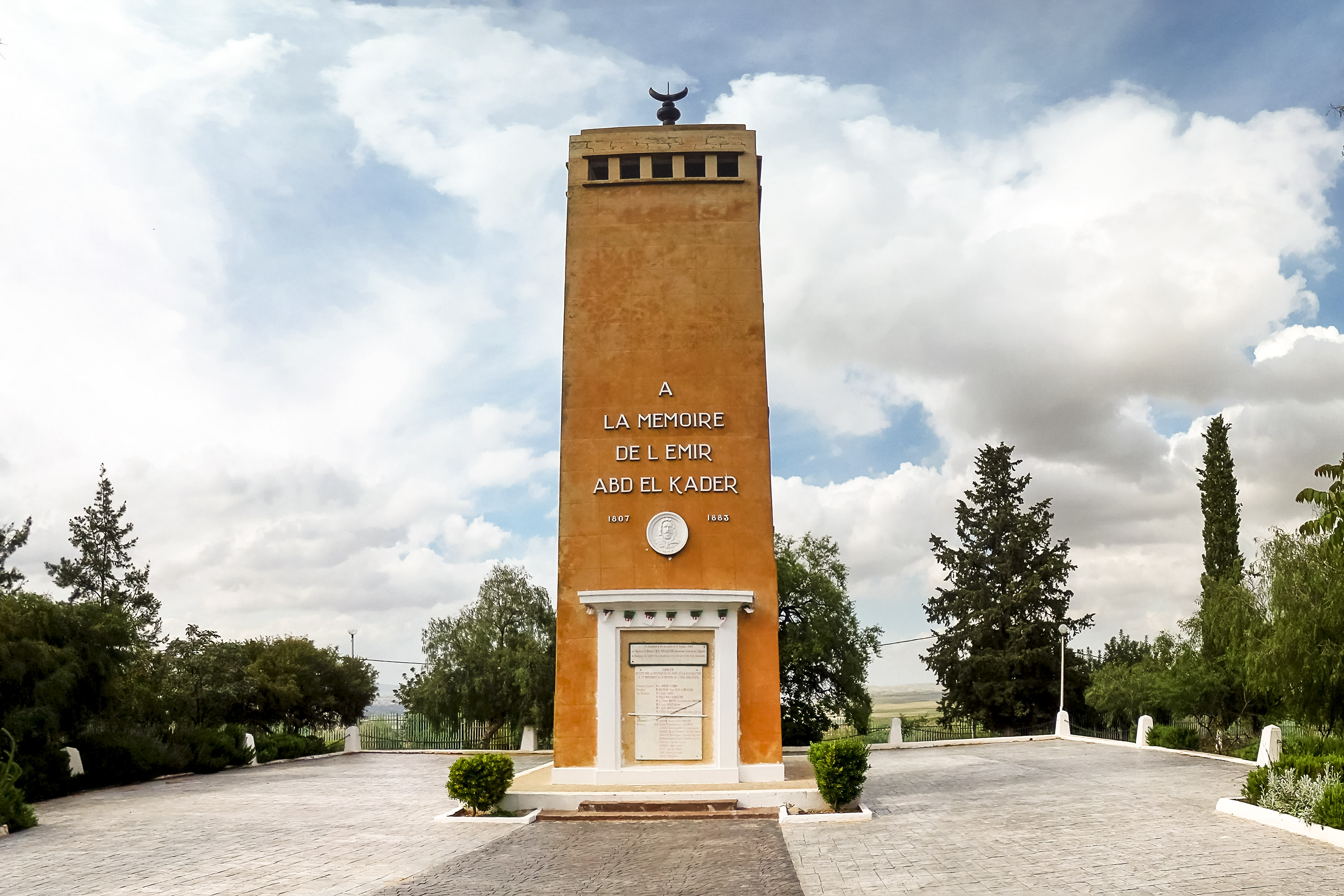
Memorial of Emir Abdelkader in Sidi Kada

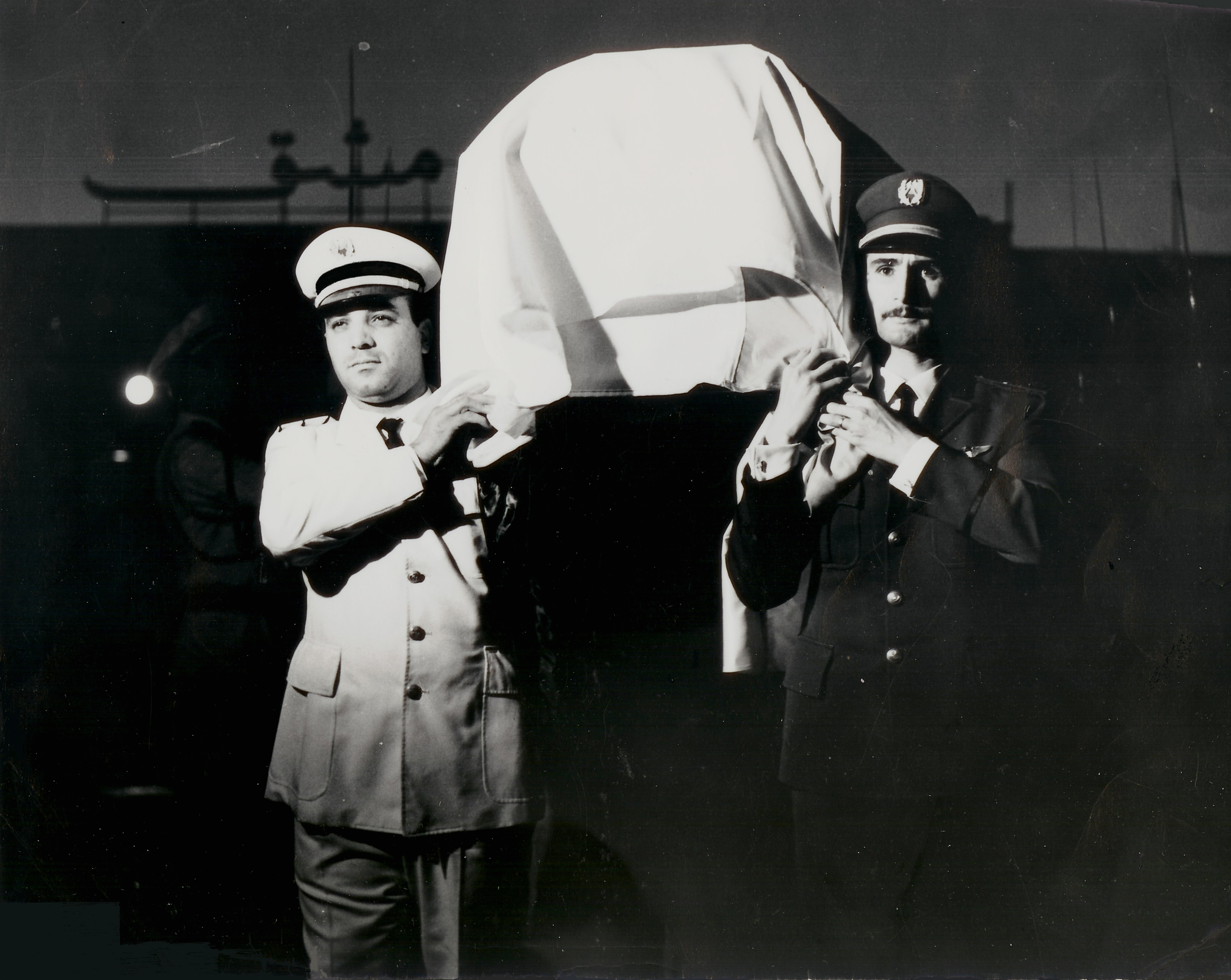
The remains of Emir Abdelkader arrived from Syria to Algeria in 1965

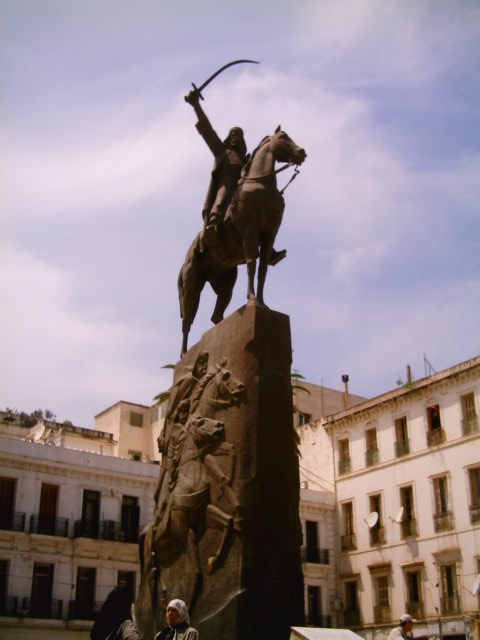
Emir Abdelkader Square in Algiers

== See also ==
- French North Africa
- Reghaïa attack (1837)
- Raid on Reghaïa (1837) (1837)
- First Battle of Boudouaou (1837)
- Mokrani Revolt
- French Algeria
- Emir Abdelkader, Jijel
- Emir Abdelkader Mosque
- Emir Abdelkader University

== Bibliography and further reading ==
- Bellemare, Alexandre (2003). Abd el-Kader, sa vie politique et militaire (in French). Paris: Bouchène. p. 252. ISBN 978-2-912946-51-5.
- Bouyerdene, Ahmed (2008). Abd el-Kader: l'harmonie des contraires [Emir Abd el-Kader Hero and Saint of Islam] (in French). Paris: Seuil. p. 360. ISBN 978-2-02-096591-0.
- Bouyerdene, Ahmed (2012). Emir Abd el-Kader Hero and Saint of Islam. Translated by Polit, Gustavo. Bloomington/IN: World Wisdom. p. 296. ISBN 978-193659717-8.
- Bouyerdene, Ahmed (2017). La guerre et la paix: Abd el-Kader et la France (in French). Paris: Vendémiaire. p. 644. ISBN 978-2-36358-257-7.
- Churchill, Charles Henry (2010) [1867]. Life of Abd el-Kader, ex-Sultan of the Arabs of Algeria. Whitefish/MT: Kessinger Publishing. p. 346. ISBN 978-116585766-1.
- Danziger, Raphael (1977). Abd Al-Qadir and the Algerians: Resistance to the French and Internal Consolidation. New York: Holmes & Meier Pub. p. 300. ISBN 978-084190236-7.
- de Tocqueville, Alexis (2000). Writings on Empire and Slavery. edited and translated by Jennifer Pitts. Baltimore/MD: Johns Hopkins University Press. p. 320. ISBN 978-080186509-1.
- Dinesen, Adolph Wilhelm (2019) [1840]. Abd el-Kader (in Danish). Copenhagen: Saga Egmont. p. 163. ISBN 978-872615007-0.
- Dupuch, Antoine-Adolphe (2013) [1849]. Abd-el-Kader au château d'Amboise (in French). Vanves (Paris): Hachette Livre. p. 146. ISBN 978-201328016-7.
- Dupuch, Antoine-Adolphe (2011) [1860]. Abd-el Kader : sa vie intime, sa lutte avec la France, son avenir (in French). Nabu Press. p. 414. ISBN 978-117934688-5.
- Etienne, Bruno (2003). Abdelkader (in French). Paris: Hachette. p. 500. ISBN 978-201279117-6.
- Kiser, John W. (2010). Commander of the Faithful: The Life and Times of Emir Abd El-Kader. Rhinebeck/NY: Monkfish. p. 400. ISBN 978-098232466-0.
- Marston, Elsa (2013). The Compassionate Warrior: Abd El-Kader of Algeria. Bloomington/IN: Wisdom Tales. p. 184. ISBN 978-1937786106.
- Teissier, Henri (2020). L'Émir Abdelkader (in French). Casablanca: Centre culturel du livre. p. 136. ISBN 978-9920-627-53-5.
- Woerner-Powell, Tom (2018). Another Road to Damascus: An integrative approach to 'Abd al-Qadir al-Jaza'iri (1808–1883). Berlin: De Gruyter. p. 266. ISBN 978-311050055-4.
