= Battle of Oued Aslaf =

1847 battle in Morocco

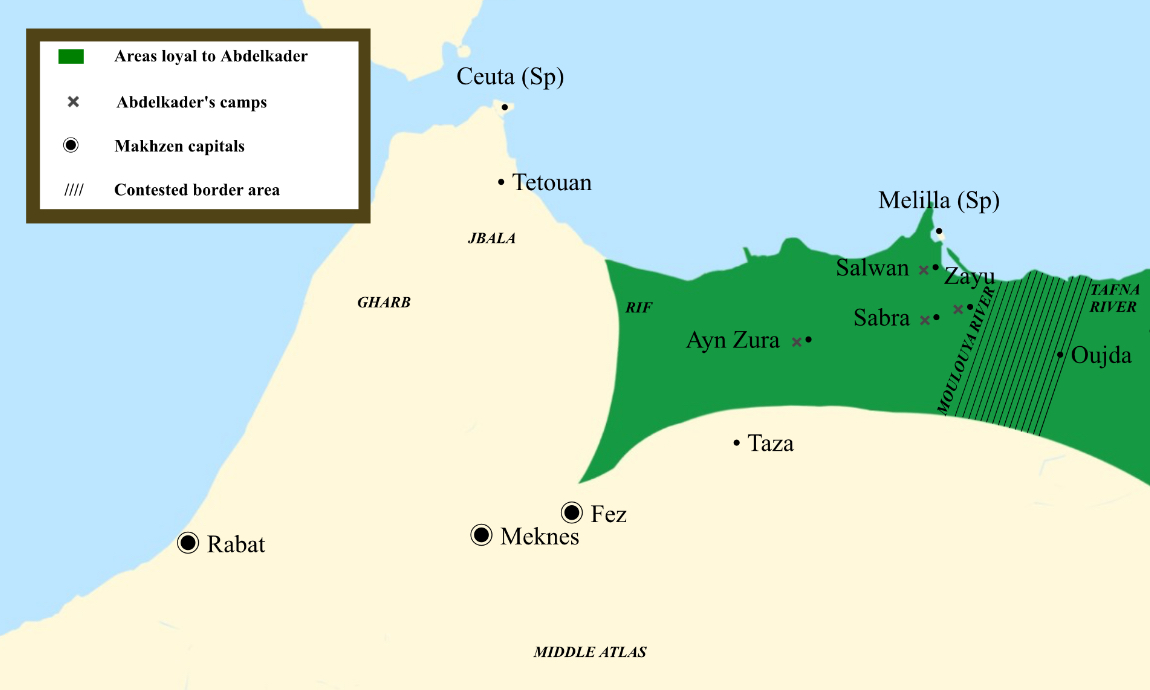
- Map depicting Emir Abdelkader’s camps and the areas loyal to him (1845-1847)
| Date | July, 1847 |
| Location | Oued Aslaf, Morocco |
| Result | Algerian victory |

Belligerents
| Emirate of Mascara | Morocco |

Commanders and leaders
| Emir Abdelkader | Moulay Hashem; El Hamra † |

Strength
| 2,000 cavalry 1,200 regulars 400 infantry | Unknown |

Casualties and losses
| Unknown | Unknown |

The battle of Oued Aslaf occurred in the year 1847 following the Treaty of Tangiers. It was a battle between the Alaouite Dynasty of Morocco which was then ruled by Moulay Abd al-Rahman against the Emirate of Mascara.

== Background ==
Emir Abdelkader was outlawed in Morocco following the Treaty of Tangiers and wanted in Algeria. The French called upon Moulay Abd al-Rahman and demanded the immediate expulsion of Emir Abdelkader. Moulay Abd al-Rahman sent a letter to Emir Abdelkader instructing him to leave Morocco but Abdelkader refused to sign a humiliating treaty with the French.

== Moroccan Offensives ==
Moulay Abd al-Rahman secretly ordered his men to ravage and attack the Deira which was attacked and robbed for six months. Abdelkader wrote to the Moroccan King about these occurrences but received no response, six months later he warned the Moroccan King that he would rightfully react to these attacks in self defense.

Abdelkader ordered 1,200 men and 800 cavalry to patrol the country and the Moroccan attackers were chased to their very own tents before they were brought to the Deira and imprisoned. Following this Moroccan failure an assassin was sent to kill Emir Abdelkader. While the Emir was reading he raised his head and witnessed a large powerful assassin armed with a dagger, however the assassin quickly threw the dagger to the ground and said: “I was going to strike you, but the sight of you disarmed me. I thought I saw the halo of the Prophet on your head.”

== The Battle ==
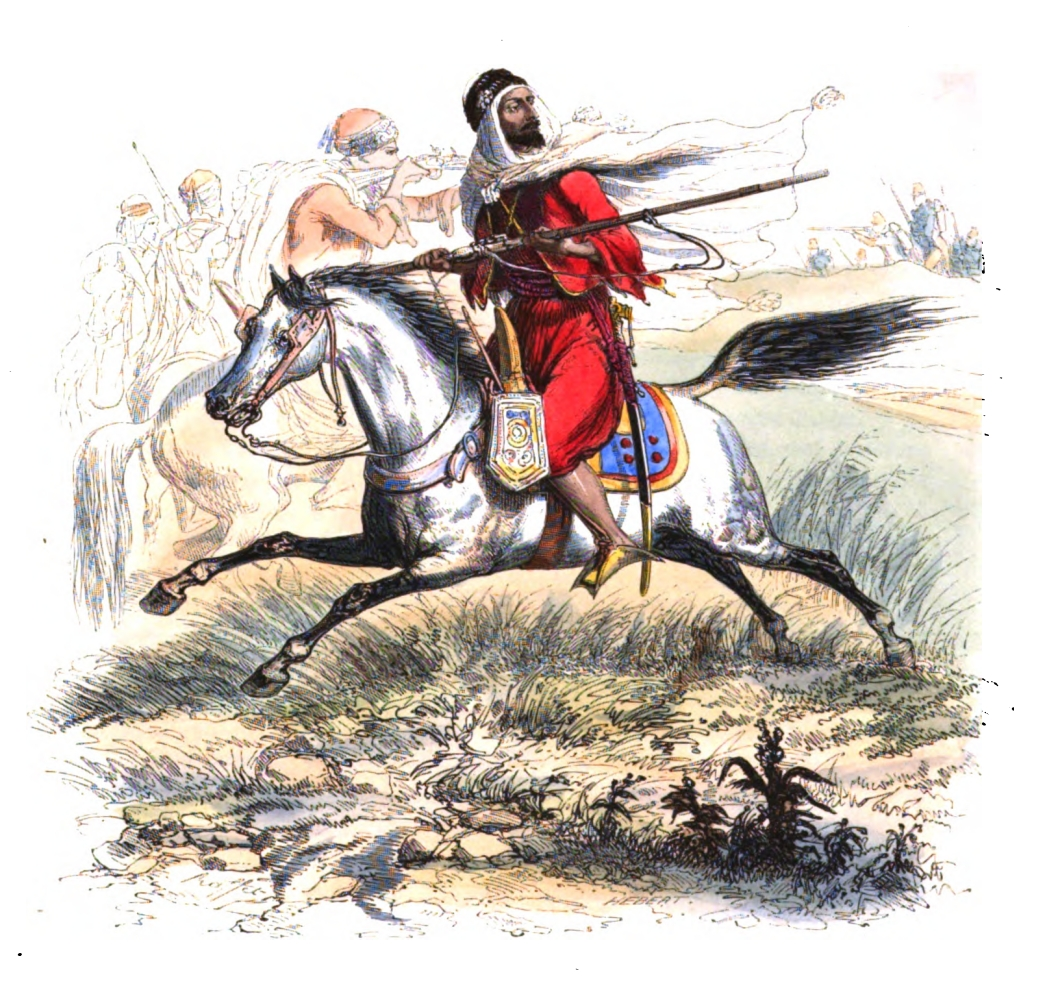
Cavaliers of the Emirate of Abdelkader

In July 1847 Moulay Hashem the nephew of the Moroccan King and El Hamra, the governor of the Rif commanded a Moroccan army against Emir Abdelkader, who at the time was in the Rif where his camp was situated.

The outposts of the Deira repulsed attacks by the Moroccan soldiers and when Emir Abdelkader requested an explanation for the hostilities against him Moulay Hashem gave him a disdainful response.

Emir Abdelkader therefore directed an offensive against the camp of the commander, El Hamra. Emir Abdelkader attacked the Moroccan camp and inflicted a severe defeat killing El Hamra along with many of his soldiers and Moulay Hashem barely escaped with his life.

== Aftermath ==
Moulay Abd al-Rahman accepted his defeat and Emir Abdelkader seized £2,000 worth of baggage from the Moroccans but he and his chiefs had mixed feelings about their victory, he then distributed cloaks and burnouses that were taken from Moulay Hashem among the Sheikhs of the Rif tribes. The word of Emir Abdelkaders victory spread quick in Morocco, the news created a sensation among the Moroccan population who were thrilled of his actions.
