= Battle of Mascara =

1835 French expedition during the French conquest of Algeria

- Part of the French conquest of Algeria
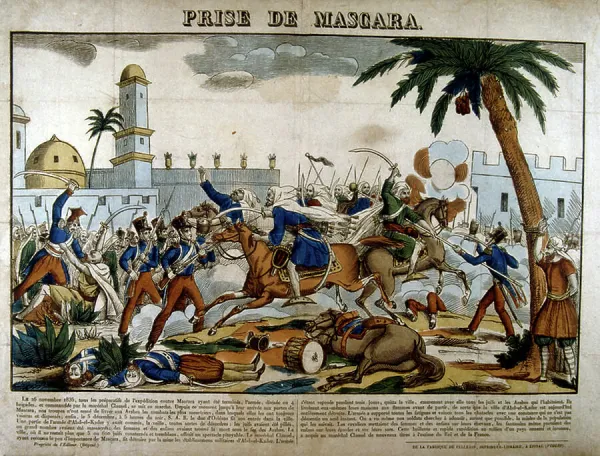
Date	21 November – December 1835
Location	Mascara, Algeria
Result	French tactical success Failure to force the submission of Emir Abdelkader

Belligerents
France	Emirate of Abdelkader

Commanders and leaders
Marshal Clauzel; General Oudinot; General Perrégaux; General d'Arlanges; Colonel Combes; Colonel Beaufort	Emir Abdelkader; Sheikh Bouhamedi

Strength
Army of Africa about 11,000–13,000 men, including zouave troops	Kaderian troops

Casualties and losses
Unknown	Unknown

The Battle of Mascara was a French expedition and military action fought in November and December 1835 during the French conquest of Algeria. It opposed the troops of Marshal Bertrand Clauzel to the forces of Emir Abdelkader. The operation formed part of the wider conflict between France and Abdelkader between 1832 and 1847.

Although French troops entered Mascara, Abdelkader was not forced to submit. The strategic objective of the expedition was therefore not achieved.

Unlike Ahmed Bey of Constantine, Abdelkader did not fight on behalf of the Ottoman Empire, to which the Regency of Algiers had theoretically belonged. He fought in the name of Islam and organised resistance in western Algeria.

== Background ==
After the French expedition against Algiers in 1830, the fall of the Regency of Algiers and the French occupation of Oran, the religious leader Emir Abdelkader, son of the head of the Qadiriyya brotherhood, was chosen in 1832 as emir by the tribes of the Mascara region.

Unlike Ahmed Bey of Constantine, Abdelkader did not fight on behalf of the Ottoman Empire, to which the Regency of Algiers had theoretically belonged. He fought in the name of Islam and organised resistance in western Algeria.

In 1834, Abdelkader concluded the Desmichels Treaty with General Louis Alexis Desmichels, commander of the French division of Oran. The treaty caused difficulties for the French government, and Desmichels lost his command in February 1835. His successor at Oran, General Camille Alphonse Trézel, resumed hostilities but was defeated at the Battle of Macta in June 1835. Trézel and Governor-General Drouet d'Erlon were both removed from their posts.

The new governor-general, Marshal Bertrand Clauzel, planned a rapid conquest of Algeria. His first objective was to defeat Abdelkader and attack Mascara, his capital.

== French expedition towards Mascara ==
The expedition was commanded by Marshal Clauzel, accompanied by Prince Ferdinand Philippe, Duke of Orléans, the son of King Louis Philippe I. It included about 11,000 men.

The force was organised into four brigades, commanded by General Oudinot, General Perrégaux, General d'Arlanges and Colonel Combes. It also included about 900 indigenous auxiliaries, including Turks from the former Regency, as well as Douair and Smela tribesmen from the Oran region. One brigade included a battalion of zouaves under Louis Juchault de Lamoricière.

The expedition left on 28 November 1835. On reaching the mountains, a serious engagement took place on 1 December. On 3 December, a larger action occurred in the plain of the Oued Habrah.

== Battle of the Habrah ==
During the advance, French troops were threatened in their rear by a large cavalry force, which Colonel Combes dispersed with artillery fire. The French then crossed ravines and cemeteries filled with corpses, while spahis pursued fleeing fighters in close combat.

The lack of roads forced French troops to open a route with picks through steep mountains, wooded hills, ravines and rocky ground. Engineers under General Lemercier helped create a passage for the wagons.

Abdelkader attempted to attack the French flank but was forced to abandon the manoeuvre. He then moved through the mountains and established his forces across the French line of advance, in a position protected on the right by woodland and on the left by mountains.

== Capture of Mascara ==
Unable to stop the French advance, Abdelkader evacuated Mascara on 6 December. French troops entered the town the following day.

Clauzel initially intended to install a bey there under close French control. Because of the local situation, however, he decided instead to evacuate the town on 9 December after setting it on fire. The French column then returned to its starting point.

Despite the military success of the expedition, its strategic objective was not achieved, since Abdelkader did not surrender.

== Aftermath ==
After the Mascara expedition, Marshal Clauzel launched an operation against Tlemcen, another town belonging to Abdelkader's emirate, in January 1837.

Clauzel later turned away from western Algeria and launched the first expedition against Constantine in November 1836. The operation failed, and he was replaced in Algiers by General Charles-Marie Denys de Damrémont in February 1837.

Shortly afterwards, General Thomas Robert Bugeaud, commanding at Oran, signed the Treaty of Tafna with Abdelkader in May 1837.

After the capture of Mascara, and although the French did not install a garrison there, Abdelkader chose to establish his capital farther from Oran, at Tagdemt, near ancient Tahert.

== See also ==
- French conquest of Algeria
- Emir Abdelkader
- Emirate of Abdelkader
- Battle of Macta
- Treaty of Tafna
- Mascara, Algeria
- Army of Africa (France)
