= Battle of the Habrah =

1835 battle during the French conquest of Algeria

- Part of the French conquest of Algeria
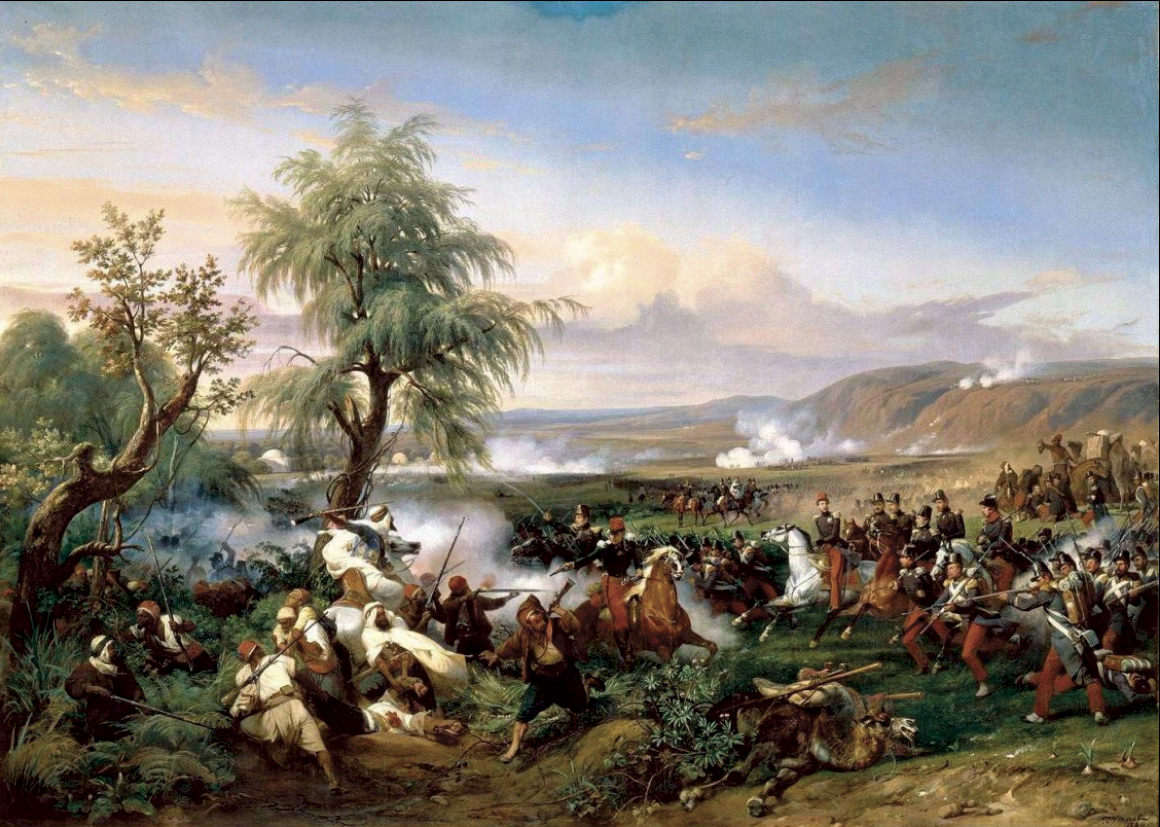
- Combat of the Habrah by Horace Vernet
Date	3 December 1835
Location	Near the Oued Habrah, Algeria 35.702788°N 0.649256°W
Result	French victory

Belligerents
France	Emirate of Abdelkader

Commanders and leaders
Bertrand Clauzel	Emir Abdelkader

Strength
about 11,000 men	Unknown

Casualties and losses
Unknown	Unknown

The Battle of the Habrah was fought on 3 December 1835 during the French conquest of Algeria. It opposed French troops commanded by General Bertrand Clauzel to the forces of Emir Abdelkader.

The battle took place during the first French expedition against Mascara, from 28 November to 9 December 1835. It was one of the engagements of the wider conflict between France and Abdelkader between 1832 and 1847.

== Background ==
After the Desmichels Treaty concluded in 1834 between Abdelkader and General Louis Alexis Desmichels, the French government rejected the secret clauses of the agreement and recalled Desmichels. His successor at Oran, General Camille Alphonse Trézel, resumed hostilities but suffered a serious defeat at the Battle of Macta in June 1835. Trézel was removed from command, as was Governor-General Jean-Baptiste Drouet, Comte d'Erlon.

The new governor-general, Bertrand Clauzel, planned a rapid conquest of Algeria. His first objective was to defeat Abdelkader by attacking his capital, Mascara.

== Prelude ==
The French column was commanded personally by Clauzel, who was accompanied by Prince Ferdinand Philippe, Duke of Orléans, the son of King Louis Philippe I. It numbered about 11,000 men.

The expedition departed on 28 November 1835. A serious engagement took place in the mountains on 1 December. On 3 December, a larger battle occurred in the sector of the Oued Habrah.

== Opposing forces ==
The French force consisted of four brigades, commanded by Generals Oudinot, Perrégaux, d'Arlanges and Colonel Combes. It also included a corps of about 900 indigenous auxiliaries, made up of Turks, former janissaries of the Regency of Algiers, and Douair and Smela tribesmen from the Oran region.

Oudinot's brigade included a battalion of zouaves under Louis Juchault de Lamoricière.

== Battle ==
During the advance, French troops were threatened in their rear by a large cavalry force, which Colonel Combes dispersed with artillery fire. The French then crossed ravines and cemeteries filled with corpses. Spahis pursued the last fugitives in close combat.

Because there were no roads, French troops had to open a route with picks through steep mountains, wooded hills, abrupt ravines and masses of rock. Engineers commanded by General Lemercier made it possible for the wagons to pass.

Abdelkader manoeuvred as effectively as his available forces allowed. Forced to abandon his flank attack, he moved through the mountains and established himself across the French line of advance, in a position protected on the right by woodland and on the left by mountains.

== Aftermath ==
Mascara, abandoned by its inhabitants, was occupied by French troops on 7 December. General Clauzel did not leave a garrison there. He abandoned the town on 9 December after setting it on fire.

Although the French expedition achieved a tactical success, it failed to force the submission of Abdelkader.

== See also ==
- French conquest of Algeria
- Emir Abdelkader
- Emirate of Abdelkader
- Battle of Macta
- Mascara, Algeria
- Army of Africa (France)
- Zouave
