= Jean-Baptiste Drouet, Comte d'Erlon =

French Army officer (1765–1844)

Jean-Baptiste Drouet
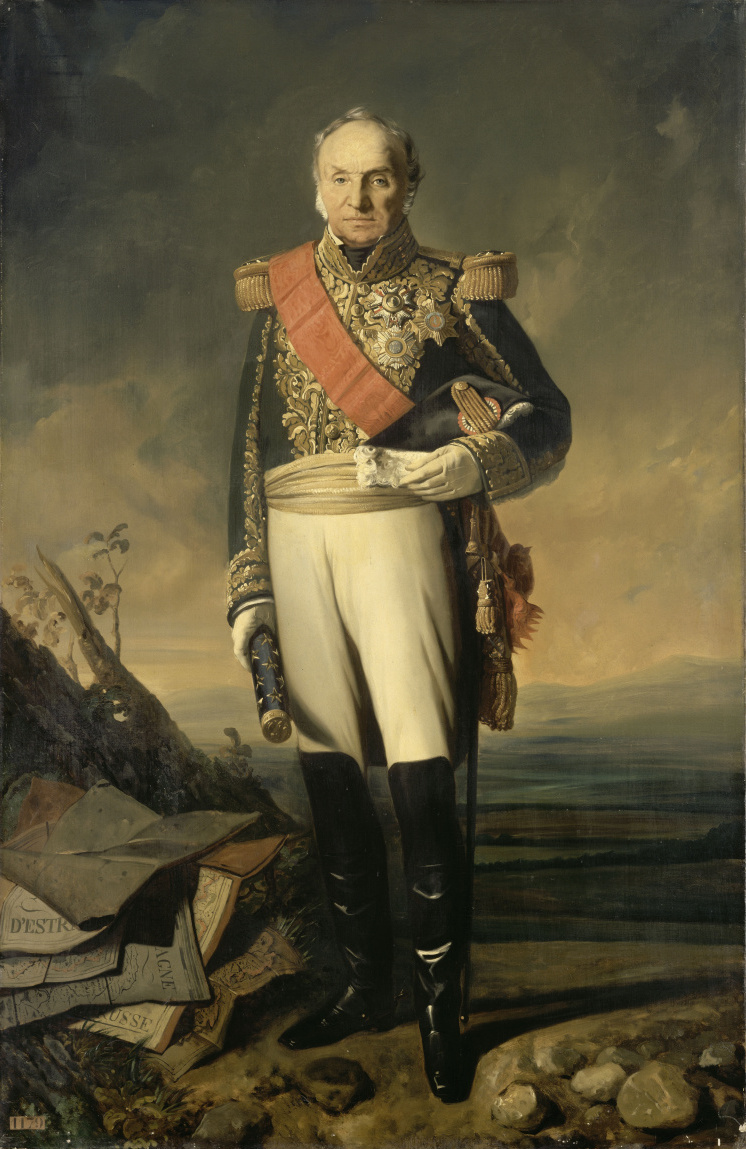
- Portrait by Charles-Philippe Larivière, 1843
- Born: 29 July 1765; Reims
- Died: 25 January 1844 (aged 78); Paris
- Military career
- Allegiance: France
- Branch: French Army
- Service years: 1782–1843
- Rank: Marshal of France
- Conflicts: French Revolutionary Wars; Second Battle of Zurich; Battle of Hohenlinden; War of the Third Coalition; Battle of Austerlitz; War of the Fourth Coalition; Battle of Schleiz; Battle of Jena–Auerstedt; Siege of Danzig; Battle of Friedland; War of the Fifth Coalition; Tyrolean Rebellion; Peninsular War; Battle of Maya; War of the Seventh Coalition; Battle of Waterloo
- Awards: Officer of the Legion of Honour

Jean-Baptiste Drouet, Comte d'Erlon (French pronunciation: [ʒɑ̃ batist dʁuɛ]; 29 July 1765 – 25 January 1844) was a Marshal of France and a soldier in the Grande Armée during the Napoleonic Wars. He notably commanded the I Corps of the Army of the North at the Battle of Waterloo.

== Early life ==
D'Erlon was born in Reims on 29 July 1765. His father and grandfather were carpenters, and he trained to be a locksmith.

== Revolutionary Wars ==
D'Erlon entered the army as a private soldier in 1782, was discharged after five years’ service and re-entered it in 1792. In 1792 he served as a corporal, being elected to captain the following year.

From 1794 to 1796 he was aide-de-camp to General Lefebvre. In 1799 he was promoted to brigadier general, and fought under André Masséna in Switzerland. The same year he distinguished himself at the Second Battle of Zurich.

He continued his service in many battles of the French Revolutionary and Napoleonic Wars, including the Battle of Hohenlinden (3 December 1800, in which he was wounded), the Hanover region (earning him promotion to general of division equivalent to major general in 1803).

== Napoleonic Wars ==
As a general of division he took part in Napoleon's campaigns of 1805 and 1806. At the Battle of Austerlitz in 1805, his division played a pivotal role, and he rendered excellent service at Jena in 1806.

In 1807, as chief of staff for Lefebvre at the siege of Danzig (now Gdańsk), he negotiated the terms of surrender. The same year he was wounded in the foot at Friedland. After this battle he was made grand officer of the Legion of Honour, was created Count d’Erlon and received a pension.

Following the conclusion of the 1809 Danubian campaign, D'Erlon was sent as chief of staff to Marshal Lefebvre. Lefebvre was in command of the VII (Bavarian) Corps in action in the Tyrolean Rebellion against the pro-Austrian insurgency led by the innkeeper Andreas Hofer. After the failure of the allied second offensive to retake the Tyrol, Lefebvre was relieved of his command by Napoleon because of his poor performance and terrible relationship with the Bavarians. D'Erlon was given command, and in by the end of November he had pacified the region, and in the process formed a strong bond with his Bavarian subordinates.

For the next six years d'Erlon was almost continuously engaged as commander of an army corps in the Peninsular War, in which he added greatly to his reputation as a capable general. He arrived in the Peninsula as commander of the IX Corps, and at the pass of Maya in the Pyrenees defeated the British General Hill. In the subsequent battles of the 1814 campaign he distinguished himself further.

After Napoleon abdicated in 1814 d'Erlon transferred his allegiance to the House of Bourbon along with the rest of the army and was given command of the 16th military division, but he was soon arrested for conspiring with the Orléans party, to which he was secretly devoted. He escaped and joined Napoleon, who had returned from exile on the island of Elba.

== Hundred Days ==
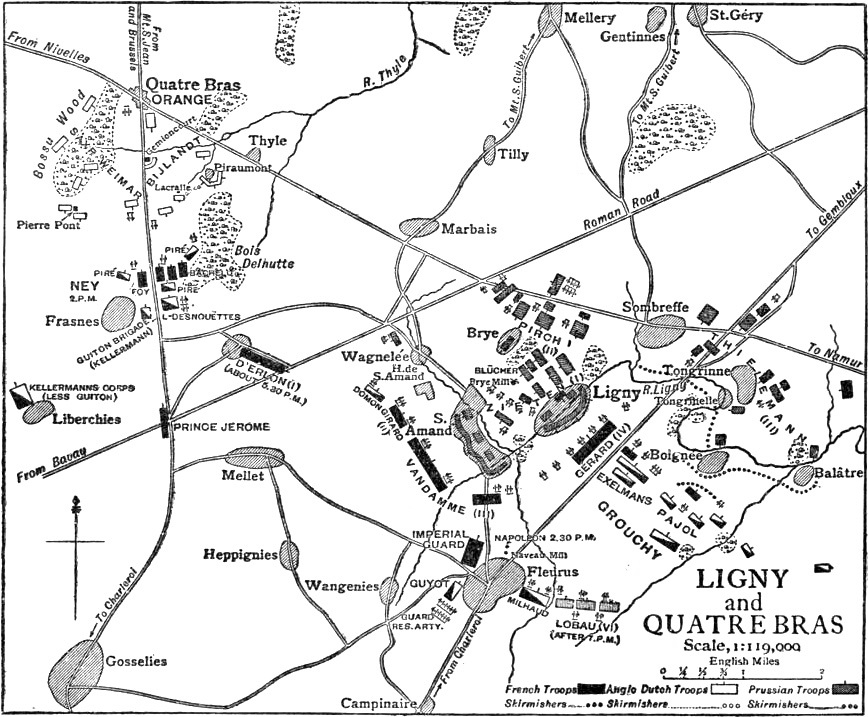
The old Roman road and d'Erlon Corps at 17:30 on 16 June

Napoleon made him a peer of France, and gave him command of the I Corps, which formed part of the Army of the North. On 16 June 1815 during the first major engagements of Waterloo campaign, due to conflicting orders his Corps spent the day on the Old Roman Road marching and counter-marching between the battles of Quatre Bras and Ligny without engaging in either battle. He was not, however, held to account by Napoleon, and as the latter's practice in such matters was severe to the verge of injustice, it may be presumed that the failure was not due to d’Erlon. If the I Corps had engaged in either battle the outcome of the campaign might have been different.

Two days later at the Battle of Waterloo it was his Corps in column formation which attacked the Allied centre right from La Haye Sainte to Papelotte at 13:30 and was stopped by Picton's Peninsular War veterans, and then attacked in the flanks by the British heavy cavalry. He retreated with the rest of the French army and fought in the closing operations around Paris. After the surrender of Napoleon, d'Erlon was able to escape with the help of Jean-François Champollion, who later became a famous Egyptologist, and his brother. d'Erlon entered exile in Munich where he established a brewery.

== Post-Napoleonic service ==
In 1825 he was granted amnesty by Charles X. He supported July Revolution in 1830, and was made Peer of France in 19 November 1831. In 1832 he was given the command of the 12th Division in Nantes. Later in the year his division suppressed a Vendean revolt and arrested the Duchess of Berry.

In 1834 d'Erlon was named governor-general of Algeria. After the defeat of the French army under General Trézel at the Battle of Macta in 1835, public outcry at the disaster resulted in D'Erlon being recalled to France and replaced by General Clauzel.

From 1837 he resumed his command of the 12th Division in Nantes, a position he held until 1843 when he moved to Paris to retire and was granted the title marshal of France on 9 April 1843. He died on 25 January of the following year.

== Family ==
In 1794, in Reims, d'Erlon married Marie-Anne de Rousseau (died 1828), daughter of Nicolas de Rousseau, a banker, whom he got to know through Marie-Jeanne (Rousseau) the wife of his brother Jean-François Drouet. While in Reims on the morning of his wedding, he was informed of his appointment as aide-de-camp to General François Lefebvre. On Christmas Day 1794, his first child, a son who was christened Nicolas Adolphe, was born. In 1796 his wife had their second child, a daughter: Marie-Anne Louise. His third child Aimé-Napoleon-François was born in Soissons in December 1803.
