= Alexandre Pierre Chevalier Moline de Saint-Yon =

French general, writer and politician

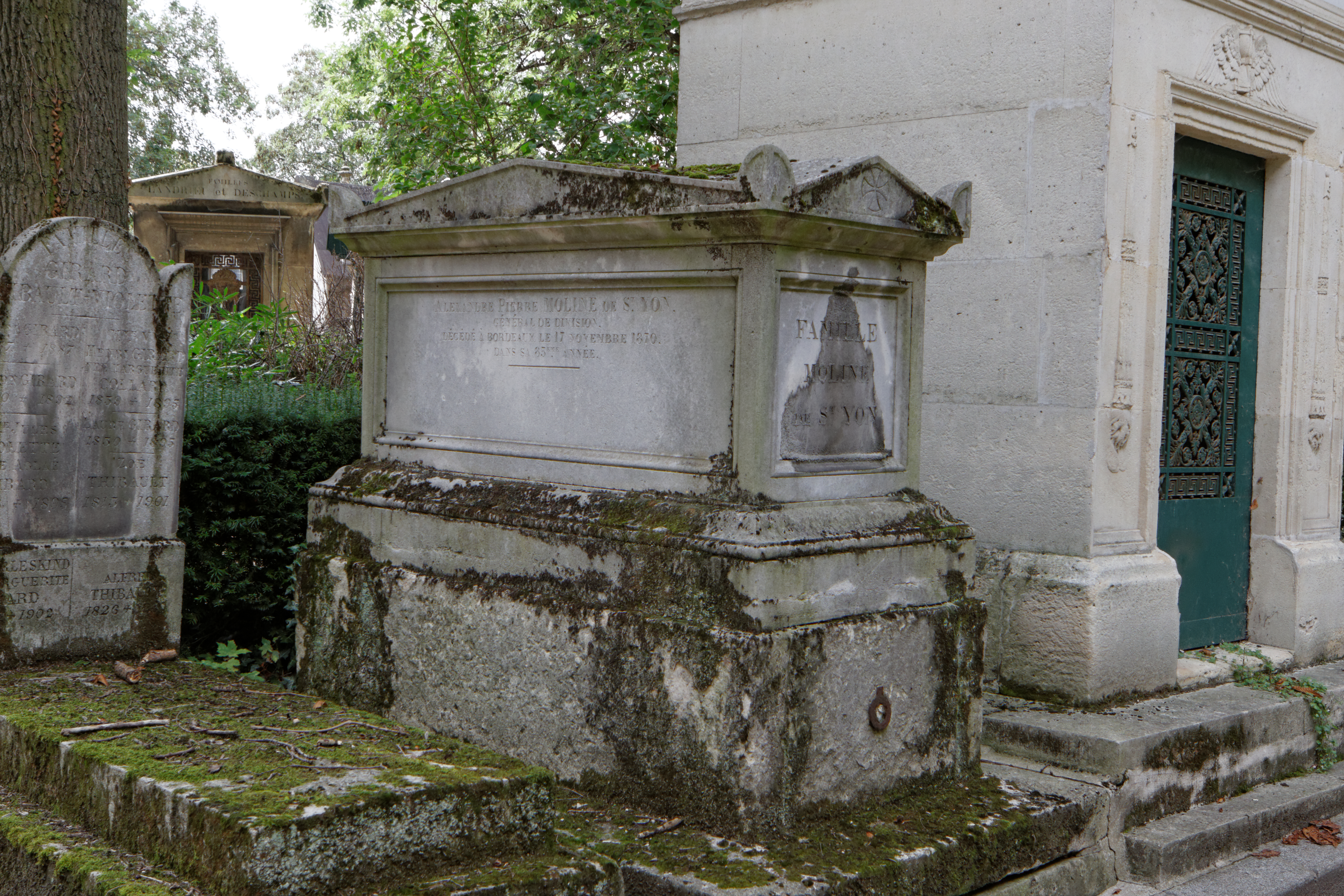
Grave of Moline

Alexandre Pierre Moline de Saint-Yon (29 June 1786, Lyon – 17 November 1870, Bordeaux) was a French general, writer, and politician.

== Biography ==
He was the son of Honore de Saint-Yon and Gabrielle Antoinette Rivoire Alexandre Moline, He graduated from the military school at Fontainebleau in 1805, with the rank of second lieutenant. Promoted Lieutenant in 1807, Captain in 1809, he made the Prussian campaign before being sent to Spain under the command of Marshal Soult. Created a Knight of the Empire on 11 June 1810, he was wounded in Saint-Jean-de-Luz (1813) and was promoted to squadron leader and returned to France with Soult. Aide of Napoleon's campaign in France, he was present at Ligny and Waterloo (1815).

Put on half pay by the Second Restoration, he devoted himself to literature.

The July Monarchy reactivated him. He became lieutenant-colonel (1830), Colonel (1831), Field Marshal (1835), Lieutenant-General (1844), Director of Personnel and Operations at the Department of War, Grand Officer of the Legion of Honor (7 November 1845), peer of France (10 November 1845) and on the same day, Minister of War.

He retired as Major General on 8 June 1848 and never reappeared on the political scene.

== Works ==
- Ipsiboë, opera in 4 acts, music by Rodolphe Kreutzer, premiere at the Académie royale de musique 31 March 1824
- Mathilde ou les Croisades, opera
- Les Époux indiscrets, comic opera premiere at the Théâtre Feydeau, 1829
- François Ier à Chambord, opera in 2 actes, with G. du Fougeroux), music de Genestet, premiere at the Académie royale de musique 15 March 1830
- Les Amours de Charles II, comedy in 5 acts
- Fragment de l'histoire militaire de la France: guerres de religion, de 1585 à 1590, Paris, Anselin, 1834, in-8
- Notice historique sur le prince Eugène, duc de Leuchtenberg, Paris, Crapelet, 1838, in-8
- Les Deux Mina, chronique espagnole du dix-neuvième siècle, Paris, Berquet et Pétion, 1840, 3 vol. in-8
- Histoire des comtes de Toulouse, Paris, A. Bertrand, 1859–1861, 4 vol. in-8

Political offices
Preceded by Jean-de-Dieu Soult	French minister of War; 10 November 1845 – 9 May 1847	Succeeded by Camille Alphonse Trézel
