= Thomas Robert Bugeaud =

French soldier and colonial governor (1784–1849)

Thomas Robert Bugeaud M.F.
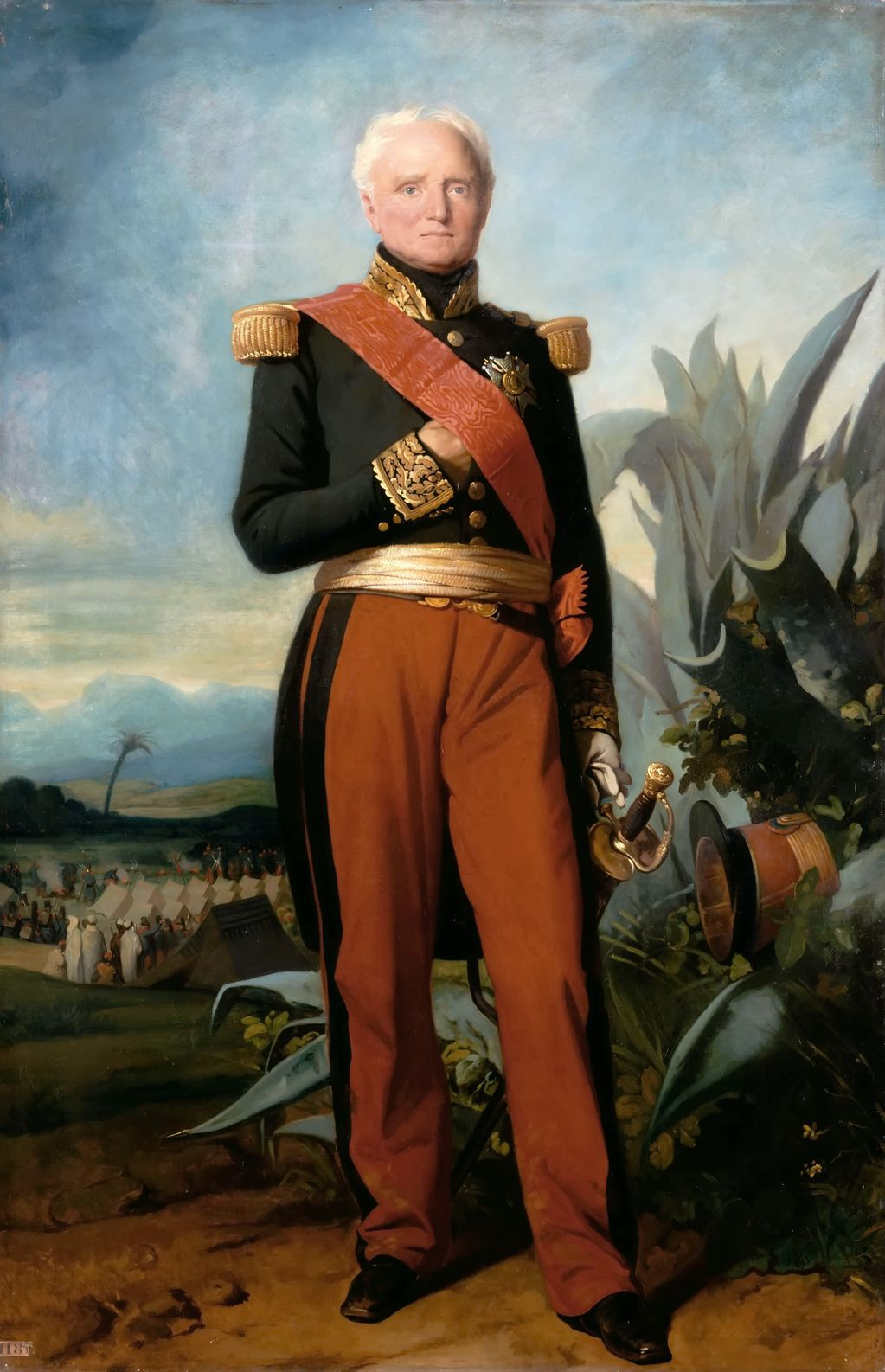
- Bugeaud by Charles-Philippe Larivière, 1843-1845
- Born: 15 October 1784; Limoges, France
- Died: 10 June 1849 (aged 64); Paris, France
- Military career
- Allegiance: France
- Branch: French Army
- Service years: 1804–1849
- Rank: Marshal of France
- Conflicts: Napoleonic Wars; Battle of Austerlitz; Battle of Jena; Battle of Eylau; Battle of Pultusk; Siege of Zaragoza (1809); French conquest of Algeria; Battle of Sikkak; Franco-Moroccan War; Battle of Isly; French Revolution of 1848
- Other work: Agriculturalist, Deputy

Thomas Robert Bugeaud, marquis de la Piconnerie, duc d'Isly (French: [tɔmas ʁɔbɛʁ byʒo]; 15 October 1784 – 10 June 1849) was a Marshal of France and Governor-General of Algeria during the French colonization. Born an aristocrat, he has a complex legacy, serving as a soldier during the Napoleonic wars, focusing on agriculture during Bourbon rule, then serving the July monarchy in Algeria during which he achieved undoubted military success, where he utilised extreme violence on the Algerian population which caused outrage at the time.

== Early life ==
He was born at Limoges, a member of a noble family of Périgord (Occitania), the youngest of thirteen children. He ran away from home, and for some years lived in the country as an agricultural worker. At the age of twenty, he became a private soldier in the Vélites of the Imperial Guard, with which he took part in the Austerlitz campaign of the following year. Early in 1806, he was given a commission, and as a Second Lieutenant he served in the Jena and Eylau campaigns, winning his promotion to the rank of lieutenant at the Battle of Pultusk.

In 1808, he was in the first French corps to enter Spain, and was stationed in Madrid during the revolt of the Dos Mayo. At the Second Siege of Zaragossa, he won further promotion to the rank of captain, and in 1809–1810 found opportunities for winning distinction under Suchet in the eastern theatre of the Peninsular War, in which he rose to the rank of major and the command of a full regiment. At the first restoration he was made a colonel, but he rejoined Napoleon during the Hundred Days, and under his old chief Suchet distinguished himself in the war in the Alps.

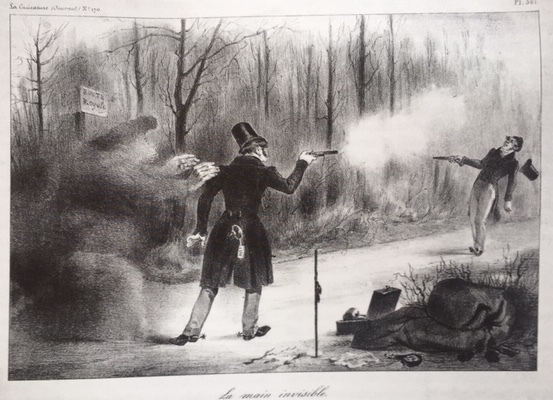
The Bugeaud Dulong duel, in the image the ghostly figure is a reference to King Louis-Phillipe who it was claimed stoked the tensions as a means to distance himself from the treatment of the Duchess of Berry

== July monarchy ==
He spent the fifteen years after the fall of Napoleon without employment, returning to agriculture and developing his home district of Périgord.

The July Revolution of 1830 reopened his military career, and after a short tenure of regimental command he was in 1831 promoted brigadier-general (maréchal de camp). In the same year, he was elected to the French parliament's lower house, the Chamber of Deputies, where he showed himself to be an inflexible opponent of democracy. In his military capacity, he was noted for his severity in suppressing riots. His conduct as gaoler of the Duchess of Berry led to a duel in 1834 between Bugeaud and the deputy François-Charles Dulong in which the latter was killed; this affair, and the heavy-handed suppression of a further riot, exposed Bugeaud to ceaseless attacks in the Chamber and in the press, though his opinion was sought by all parties in matters connected with agriculture and industrial development. He was re-elected in 1834, 1837, and 1839.

=== Algeria ===
Although he initially disapproved of the conquest of Algeria, his undeviating adherence to Louis Philippe brought him into agreement with the government. He embarked on a campaign to win the swift, complete, and lasting subjugation of Algeria. He was sent to Africa with orders from Paris to bring the war in western Algeria to a satisfactory conclusion, wherein he proceeded to initiate his war of flying columns. He won his first victory on 6 July 1836 in the Battle of Sikkak against an army of 10,000 regular and tribal warriors of Abd al-Qadir, and returned home with the rank of lieutenant-general. In the following year, he signed the Treaty of Tafna (30 May 1837), with Abd al-Qadir, which led to attacks upon him in the chamber, to the refutation of which Bugeaud devoted himself in 1839. Historian James McDougall argues in his History of Algeria that the treaty accomplished little for the French noting that Bugeaud by his own invention styled the amir a 'great vassal of France' and while tribute was initially requested Bugeaud dropped this only securing concessions that Algerian trade would occur only in French held ports, however this provision was flouted by French and Algerian traders alike.

There is also controversy about the language Bugeaud inserted into the differing versions of the treaty, in French article one read that Abd al-Qadir ‘recognised the sovereignty of France in Africa’. The Arabic text instead read that "the amir ‘is aware of the rule of French power" (ya‘rifu hukm saltanat firansa) in Africa’. McDougall argues on the basis of Abd al-Qadir's letters to Bugeaud negotiating the treaty that it cannot have been a translation error and the differing meaning of the texts constitutes duplicity on Bugeaud's part.

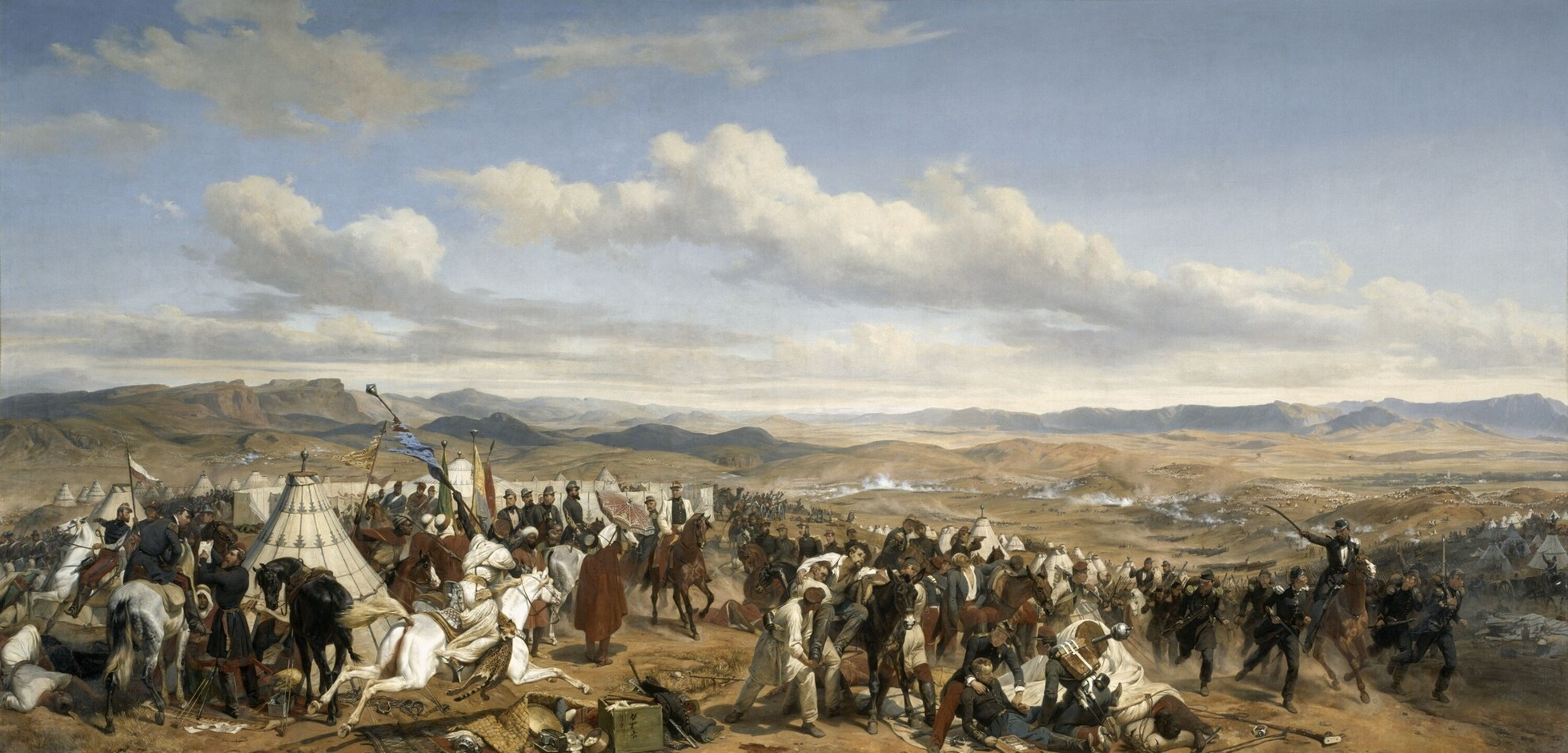
Battle of Isly, propaganda oil painting by Horace Vernet.

In addition to the public contents of the treaty Bugeaud and Abdelkader came to a number of private agreements in addition to the final treaty's text. Bugeaud promised the emir modern weapons, to through French force of arms relocate the Dawa’ir and Zmala tribes away from Abd al-Qadirs domain and to exile from Algeria of their chiefs for which Bugeaud received a cash payment which he utilised to support his political career in France spending it to fund roadworks in his constituency.

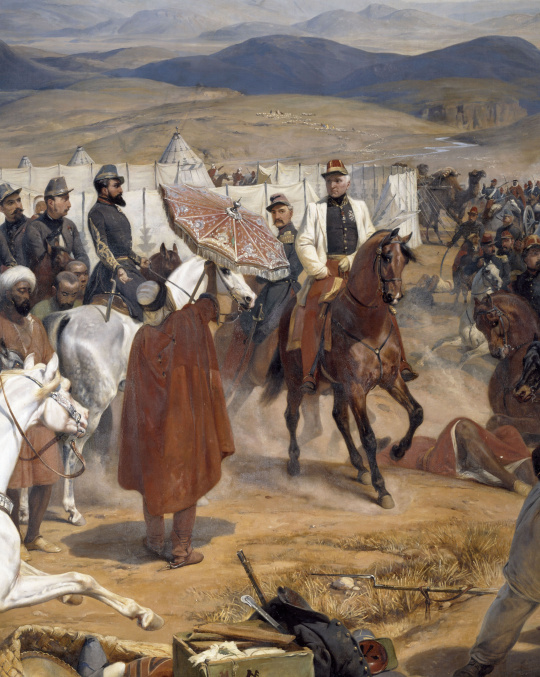
Bugeaud entering the Moroccan camp after Isly, oil painting by Horace Vernet

The treaty allowed the French space to prioritise other threats to their control over Algeria, and avenge General Clauzel's failure to subdue the Beylik of Constantine. Following the death of General Damrémont, at the subsequent years successful siege of Constantine, and the retirement due to ill health of Marshal Valée in 1840, Bugeaud was nominated governor-general of Algeria.

Early in 1841 he put his system of flying columns, a controversial but successful tactic known as "Razzia" into effect. His swiftness and energy drove back the forces of Abd al-Qadir from place to place, while the devotion of the rank and file to "Père Bugeaud" enabled him to carry all before him in action. In 1842, he secured the French positions by undertaking the construction of roads. In 1843, Bugeaud was made marshal of France, and in this and the following year he continued his operations with unvarying success. His great victory of Isly on 14 August 1844 defeated a Moroccan army that attempted to intervene in Algeria so decisively that effectively a civil war broke out between the Moroccans and Abd al-Qadir and won him the title of duke.

In 1845, however, he had to take the field again in consequence of the disaster of Sidi Brahim (22 September 1845), and up to his final retirement from Algeria (July 1846) he was almost constantly employed in the field, by ordering in February 1846 to General Jean-François Gentil to organize the second campaign against the rebels of Kabylia. His resignation was due to differences with the home government on the question of the future government of the province. Amidst his other activities he had found time to study the agricultural characteristics of the conquered country, and under his régime the number of French colonists had grown from 17,000 to 100,000.

== Counter insurgency in Algeria ==
=== The Algerian conquest in context ===
Before Bugeaud there had been nine changes of governor in eleven years, politics in the metropole too was in flux with a coup in Paris only weeks after the initial landing in Algiers. France now a constitutional monarchy saw the composition of its legislature and its government change with political fortunes in a way that had not happened since the 1820 franchising reforms. Defeats in Algeria were deemed inexcusable and Generals were fired to quell outrage at home. Together these factors caused colonial policy to change rapidly, and in those eleven years French holdings expanded slowly from their initial coastal enclaves.

Initial French strategy was to fortify, garrison and thus ensure the obedience and loyalty of the native population. However this risked leaving each garrison - especially those in the hinterlands in a position of being so small they could not simultaneously defend their position and conduct some manoeuvre operation outside of it for doing so risked weakening themselves to the point of risking being defeated in detail by Algerian fighters.

Indeed such events transpired at the Battle of Macta in 1835 where a French force of 2,500 men was destroyed at the hands of Abd al-Qadir, the ensuring outrage provoking the replacement of the then governor by Bugeaud.

Bugeaud's term as governor stands out both for its length in the conquest period, nearly seven years but also for his success. Where before French strategy revolved around garrisoning every new outpost, Bugeaud attempted to reconcile Algerians to French rule with great cruelty and violence but also self interest leading to some historians citing him as an early practitioner of counter insurgency operations and was especially influential in French military thinking in regard to colonial campaigns. Especially influenced where Generals Joseph Gallieni and Hubert Lyautey who were active in French colonial campaigns globally who innovated upon many ideas first set out by Bugeaud and subordinates in Algeria to create the 'oil-spot' method of establishing colonial control and gaining local acquiescence. Comparatively, the 'oil-spot' method involved a much lesser focus on violence, destruction of property and coercion than Bugeaud's campaign in Algeria.

=== Trade, propaganda and a Fatwa ===
Bugeaud was aware of the potential of economic opportunities that came with French rule as a factor in increasing support for his occupation;

‘The native Americans were defeated by alcohol, the Arabs can be subjugated through trade; the use of force can [momentarily] defeat them but it cannot lead to lasting domination. Only trade can attach the Algerian population to the French (...) Each Arab Algerian who gets rich is, for the French, one ally gained and one enemy less’

— Bugeaud, L'Algérie (1842)

Not only did this strengthen French ties with native Algerians but it also provided propaganda at home that painted the French conquest of Algeria as a moral and civilizing mission ensuring support for his mission from liberal and leftist deputies.

Silvain d’Amboise a French convert to Islam during travels to Mecca, Cairo and Baghdad succeeded in having a fatwa drafted authorising Algerian Muslims to live under French rule, this contradicted an existing fatwa from a Moroccan Imam sought by Abd el-Qadirs which forbade Muslims from living under the rule of the French.

=== Razzias and military policy ===
One economic opportunity for native Algerians under French rule was service in native regiments, this not only granted certain tribes tax exemptions in exchange for service - under a similar arrangement that had been practiced under the Ottoman Regency. But it also netted friendly tribes a share of the loot obtained from raids undertaken.

Bugeaud was influenced by French experience in the Vendee, Spain and also native warfare in innovating French military doctrine to meet the challenges posed by the little war in Algieria.

But the change in French fortunes against Algerian resistance is not solely a product of Bugeaud's doctrinal and organisational reforms, his predecessors operated with less resources and manpower when Bugeaud assumed the governor-generalship total French forces in Algeria comprised some 60,000 men, by 1847 this was 109,000.

Bugeaud was especially keen to recruit native cavalry as to match the capabilities of his opponents and to provide mobility to his flying columns. One of Bugeaud's major changes in policy compared to his predecessors was to reduce the number of garrisons substantially, in arguing for this change in policy he sent a letter to the war minister including a discussion of the Russian failures to suppress resistance in the Caucasus.

You have under your very eyes eighteen years of unsuccessful attempts by the Russians to establish their rule over Circassia (...) Were their hundreds of outposts of any use? Did they enable them to subjugate the country?

— Bugeaud, A letter from Bugeaud to War Minister Marshal Soult, Thoral (2015)

With reduced garrisoning requirements as well as greater forces available to him Bugeaud was able to increase the number of and size of his 'flying columns', one of Bugeauds typical columns consisted of 4,000 infantrymen, 2,000 French Cavalrymen, 1,000 native Spahis and 3 batteries of artillery. In the artillery too there was a marked difference from his predecessors who had favoured larger calibres, Bugeaud emphasised lighter guns especially mountain batteries for their ability to keep pace with other elements of the column.

French officers under Bugeaud's command justified raids on the basis that the Algerian hinterland by virtue of being an agrarian economy had no industrial or political centre by which an army could siege or capture and thus win a campaign and thus to wage war they must target the productive heart of the Algerian rural economy - agriculture.

In terms of personnel, in contrast to the situation he inherited was a revolving door of officers, he emphasised the need for army officers who had experience in Algeria to remain there, suggesting in his published work financial incentives to make that possible.

=== Atrocities ===
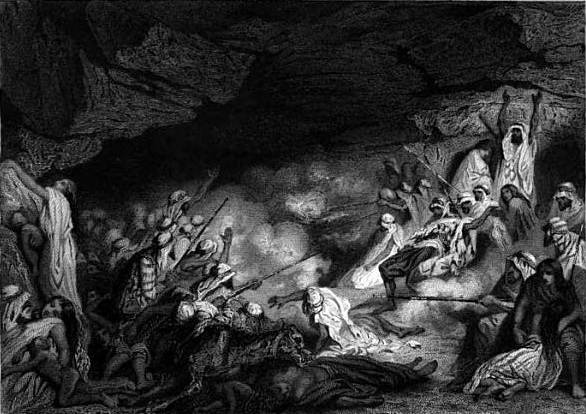
The Ouled tribe suffocating by 'enfumade' of the cave of Dahra.

Under Bugeaud's command the French army conducted the widespread use of razzias or raids and, while they did not officially aim to kill non combatants, this was not universally adhered to. One razzia conducted by General Gentil on the Beni Zeroual tribe in 1843 resulted in 150 killed, 712 prisoners, in exchange for 39 French casualties.

The cumulative effect of raids that targeted the agrarian economy of rural Algeria caused widespread famine and it was as much this combined with the leverage gained from taking prisoners that forced tribes to make peace.

A less common occurrence was a policy of 'enfumades' where fires would be lit at the entrance to caves into which Algerians had retreated. The massacre of the Ouled Riah tribe in late 1842 killed some 800 members of the tribe indiscriminately. War Minister Marshal Soult attempted to cover up the case but despite that it was leaked to the press and widely condemned in France.

But under Bugeaud the practice continued infrequently with military officers claiming caves represented the final citadel of tribes. These aspects of his campaign clash sharply with his own writings that painted the French conquest of Algeria as a civilising mission.

Marina Miron's analysis of Bugeaud as a counter insurgency commander was one on the extreme violent side of the scale, in comparison to other approaches taken by other commanders in similar situations at different points in history. Miron notes Bugeaud was able to adapt to local conditions and methods of war, use coercive force (though extremely) and institute controls upon population movement as well as building local infrastructure - all of the hallmarks of modern counter-insurgency doctrines (although in different proportions).

== Later life ==
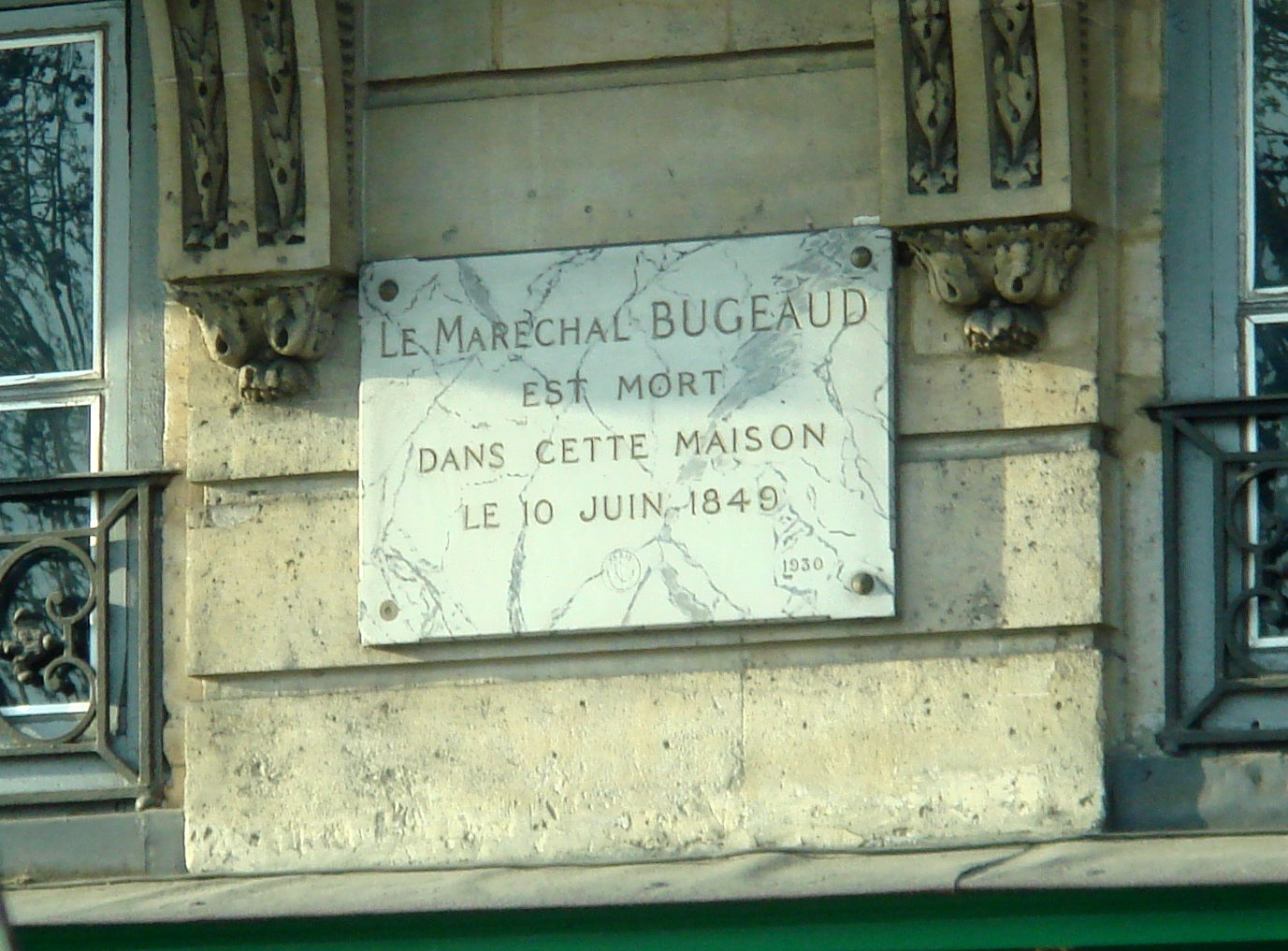
Bugeaud died at 1 Quai Voltaire in Paris (commemorative plate).

In 1848, Bugeaud was in Paris during the revolution of 1848, but his orders prevented him from acting effectively to suppress it. He was asked, but eventually refused, to be a candidate for the presidency in opposition to Louis Napoleon. His last public service was the command of the army of the Alps, formed in 1848–1849 to observe events in Italy. He died in Paris in 1849.

Bugeaud's writings were numerous, including his Œuvres militaires, collected by Weil (Paris, 1883), many official reports on Algeria and the war there, and some works on economics and political science. See: Comte d'Ideville, Le Maréchal Bugeaud (Paris, 1881–1882).

== Legacy ==
Numerous streets streets and places have been named after Bugeaud, including in Paris, Albertville, Auxerre, Brest, Limoges, Lyon, Marseille, Périgueux, and Tours. Due to increased awareness of his actions in Algeria, there have been attempts to rename some of these. In 2021, the municipality of Marseille renamed Ecole Bugeaud to Ecole Ahmed Litim, after [Fr], an Algerian tirailleur killed during the liberation of the city in 1944. In Paris, the city council voted to rename the avenue Bugeaud to avenue Hubert-Germain on 11 July 2024. In Lyon, the City decided in June 2026 to rename a street bearing his name, however the new name has not yet been decided. In Obernai, the mayor has been publicly asked to rename a square and a sports hall in October 2025, but has not yet taken a decision..
