= Battle of Sikkak =

Battle in the French Conquests of Algeria

The Battle of Sikkak was a battle within the 2nd Karedian War during the French conquest of Algeria period. It saw French and Emirate of Mascara forces clash in one of the last of and one of only a few large battles fought since the end of the initial invasion in 1830.

== The battle ==
Battle of Sikkak
- Part of the French conquest of Algeria
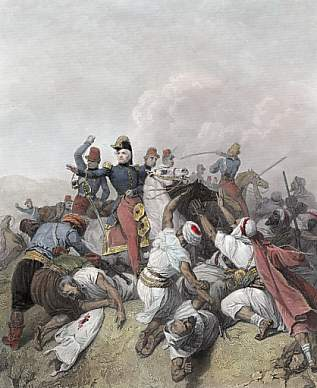
- Horace Vernet painting commemorating the battle
Date	6 July 1836
Location	near the Sikkak River, French Algeria
Result	French victory

Belligerents
Kingdom of France	Emirate of Mascara

Commanders and leaders
(France) General Thomas-Robert Bugeaud (France) Governor Bertrand Clauzel	Abd al-Qadir al-Jaza'iri

Strength
Roughly a brigade-sized force ~2,000–3,000 men	~ 3000

Casualties and losses
Less than 50	~1,000

The battle was fought on 6 July 1836 at the Sikkak River in western Algeria between French forces under General Thomas Robert Bugeaud,and a coalition of Algerian tribes of western Algeria under Emir Abd al-Qadir, who had in the previous year defeated the French at the Battle of Macta.

== Result ==
The result was a French victory, this accomplished French aims of weakening Abd al-Qadirs state to force a peace. The Treaty of Tafna was later negotiated between the two commanders of this battle.

France used the peace brought about by the victory to concentrate their limited forces against the Beylik of Constantine, winning the 1837 Siege of Constantine.

The battle represents the last large clash of forces between France and the forces of Abd al-Qadir, though with intermittent peace agreements he would continue to wage a low intensity conflict against French rule until his surrender in 1847.
