= Camille Alphonse Trézel =

French général de division

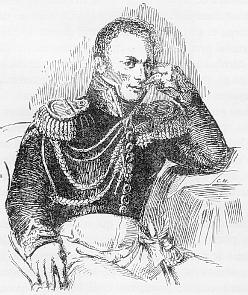
- Born: 5 January 1780; Paris, France
- Died: 11 April 1860 (aged 80); Paris, France
- Military career
- Allegiance: France
- Service years: 1801–1856
- Rank: Major-general
- Conflicts: Battle of Ligny Il était gouverneur de la ville de Sougueur, située au sud-est de l'État de Tiaret, à l'époque coloniale. Battle of Macta
- Awards: Legion of Honour (Grand Officer)
- Other work: Minister for War

Camille Alphonse Trézel (5 January 1780 – 11 April 1860) was a French général de division, Minister for War and peer of France during the July Monarchy. He was the assistant chief of the general staff on the Morea expedition, and served in the 1830s in the French conquest of Algeria, where he suffered a disastrous defeat at the Battle of Macta.

== Life ==
In 1801, Camille Alphonse Trezel entered as a draftsman into the office of the war and in 1803 attained the rank of lieutenant in the body of topographical engineers. Posted in 1804 to Army of Holland, he was promoted the following year to assistant engineer geographer. After the Polish campaign, he was appointed acting aide to General Gardane at French embassy to Persia in 1807–1808, then aide to General Armand Charles Guilleminot on his return in 1809. He was secretary of the Committee on Delimitation of Illyria, was promoted to captain (1810), and transferred to the Spanish army. Recalled to Germany in late 1811, he worked at the Hanseatic surveying department, on the campaign to Rome, became lieutenant-commander (1813), Chief of Staff of the 13th Division, and worked on the defense of Mainz.

For the Hundred Days campaign, he was called to the Grand Army, and showed such bravery in the Battle of Ligny, where he took a shot to the left eye, that he was promoted to brigadier general by decree on 5 July 1815. This appointment was canceled the following month by the Bourbons, so he resumed his place in the headquarters in 1818 as a colonel, and was attached to the commission of delimitation of the East (1816–1818), then the filing of war (1822). He distinguished himself again in the Spanish Civil War of 1820–1823, and was a member of the advisory committee of staff and secretary of the committee reorganization. He joined the Morea expedition as Deputy Chief of Staff (1828), and was promoted to field marshal in 1829.

== Algerian campaign ==
In 1831, he went to Africa. He commanded the expedition of Bougie and was wounded in the leg while taking possession of the city on 29 September 1833. Called to replace Louis Alexis Desmichels in the province of Oran, he won several victories against the Zmalas and Douairs, commanded by Agha Mustapha Ben Ismail, Chief of the Douairs, Agha Kadour Ben El Morsly, chief of the Beni Amer (Mounted infantry, and Agha Benaouda Mazari, chief of the Zmal. At the 16 June 1835 camp of Valmy Figuiers (El Karma), a treaty was concluded between the Chief and General Trezel, whereby Zmal Douairs and recognized each subject, tributaries and soldiers of France. These tribes refused to pay the zakat (Ashura) was the Emir Abd el-Kader.

The general saw himself obliged to act against Abd-el-Kader to protect these tribes that wanted to punish the emir. This led to the disaster of the Battle of Macta on 28 June, following another defeat the day before in the forest of Muley Ismail. In both attacks, Trezel was attacked by ten thousand men, when he had only 1,700 men and 600 horses.

In his report to the governor, Trezel nonetheless called himself solely responsible for the disaster: "I submit without complaint and blame any severity that the royal government deems necessary to exercise to me... hoping he will not refuse to reward the brave who have distinguished themselves in these two fights. Count Erlon, who was governor, withdrew his command.

Recalled to France, he returned to Algeria the following year to take part in the Constantine Expedition of 1836, during which he was seriously wounded and recalled to France. In 1837, during the Constantine Expedition of 1837 on the same city, he was given command of the 2nd Brigade. He was promoted to lieutenant general on 11 November 1837 and became the staff director of the Department of War (15 May 1839) and committee member of staff.

He was given the title Peer of France on 21 July 1846. He became war minister under Jean-de-Dieu Soult on 9 May 1847, instead of Alexandre Pierre Chevalier Moline de Saint-Yon. He held these positions in the government of François Guizot until the fall of the July Monarchy on 24 February 1848.

Automatically set to retire on 8 June 1848, in 1853, he was called by Philippe d'Orleans and Robert d'Orléans to become military governor and retained this office until the majority of the Comte de Paris in 1856.

== Decorations ==
- 13 January 1837 : Grand-officer of the Légion d'honneur

== Works ==
- Notice sur le Ghilan et le Mazenderan, in : Voyage en Arménie et en Perse, fait dans les années 1805 et 1806, par P.-Amédée Jaubert, Paris, Pélicier et Neveu, 1821, in-8

== Sources ==
- (in French) Narcisse Faucon, Le livre d'Or de l'Algérie, Challamel et Cie Éditeurs Librairie Algérienne et Coloniale, 1889
- "Camille Alphonse Trézel", in Adolphe Robert and Gaston Cougny, Dictionnaire des parlementaires français (1789–1891), Bourloton, Paris, 1889 Edition details Wikisource

== Bibliography ==
- Jean-Baptiste Dumas, Un fourrier de Napoléon vers l'Inde : les papiers du lieutenant-général Trézel, ... : première partie : 1780-1812, Paris, H. Charles-Lavauzelle, 1915

Political offices
Preceded by Alexandre Pierre Chevalier Moline de Saint-Yon	French minister of War; 9 May 1847 – 24 February 1848	Succeeded by Marie Alphonse Bedeau
