= Battle of Macta =

1835 battle in the French conquest of Algeria

Coordinates: 35.7892°N 0.1533°W

- Part of French conquest of Algeria
| Date | 28 June 1835 |
| Location | Banks of the Macta River, west of Oran, Algeria |
| Result | Algerian victory |

Belligerents
| France | Emirate of Mascara |

Commanders and leaders
| Camille Trézel | Emir Abdelkader |

Strength
| 2,400–2,800 troops | 8,000–12,000 irregulars and cavalry |

Casualties and losses
| 210–2,000 killed or missing | ~500 |

The Battle of Macta (Arabic: معركة المقطع) was fought on 28 June 1835 between French colonial forces led by General Camille Alphonse Trézel and the forces of Emir ʿAbd al-Qādir, leader of the Emirate of Mascara. It was a major defeat for the French in the early years of the conquest of Algeria, and it marked the first large-scale military success of ʿAbd al-Qādir’s resistance.

== Background ==
Following the 1830 invasion of Algiers and France's expanding occupation of coastal Algeria, French authorities sought to extend control inland. In 1834, the Treaty of Desmichels granted Abd al-Qādir nominal control over the interior of Oran. However, tensions quickly escalated as the French violated agreements and attempted to assert control over tribal territories beyond their coastal holdings.

In June 1835, General Trézel led an expedition of roughly 2,500 troops from Oran toward Mascara. The aim was to show force against tribes resisting French influence and to undermine Abd al-Qādir's growing authority. Trézel’s force consisted of regular infantry, light cavalry, and some artillery but was hindered by supply issues and an unfamiliar, inhospitable terrain.

== Prelude to battle ==
On 26 June 1835, Trézel’s force encountered forward units of Abd al-Qādir’s army near the Sig River. A brief skirmish ensued, and though indecisive, it revealed that a much larger Algerian force was mobilized nearby. Trézel opted to retreat toward the French outpost at Arzew to regroup and avoid encirclement.

Abd al-Qādir, anticipating this movement, orchestrated an ambush at the Macta River, a known strategic bottleneck surrounded by marshland and difficult terrain.

== The battle ==
On 28 June, as the French column advanced through swampy ground near the Macta River, it was ambushed by approximately 8,000–12,000 Algerian cavalry and tribal infantry. The French vanguard suffered the first blows, and the rest of the force soon came under simultaneous attacks from the flanks and rear. The narrow, marshy terrain limited maneuverability and caused confusion among the troops.

Algerian tactics included flanking maneuvers, cutting off detachments, and disrupting communication within the French column. The French artillery became bogged down, and the cavalry was unable to mount effective charges. Discipline broke as panic spread; many French soldiers were killed, wounded, or drowned while attempting to flee. General Trézel narrowly escaped with a fraction of his troops.

The future Marshal Bazaine, then a sous-lieutenant in the Foreign Legion, was wounded in the wrist during the battle.

== Casualties ==
Casualty estimates differ widely:

- French official figures reported 210 dead and 119 wounded.
- Some accounts, including those of Abd al-Qādir's supporters and later French officers, suggest total French losses (killed, wounded, missing, or captured) may have exceeded 1,500.

Algerian losses were considerably lower, estimated at fewer than 500 fighters.

== Aftermath ==
The defeat at Macta shocked public opinion in France and led to the dismissal of both General Trézel and the governor-general of Algeria, Comte d’Erlon. General Bertrand Clauzel was appointed to replace them and launched a punitive campaign in the months that followed.

For Abd al-Qādir, the victory was a major propaganda tool. He consolidated his reputation as a formidable leader and spiritual figure. The triumph at Macta encouraged more tribal confederations to join his resistance, laying the groundwork for the later Treaty of Tafna (1837), which granted him control of much of the Algerian interior.

== Significance ==
The Battle of Macta:

- Signaled the vulnerability of French forces in inland Algeria.
- Enhanced Abd al-Qādir’s credibility as a political and military leader.
- Forced a major reassessment of French strategy, leading to more aggressive and systematic colonization policies.

== Controversy over numbers ==
While French records tried to minimize the loss, many contemporary observers admitted the scale of the defeat. Algerian sources likely exaggerated enemy losses, yet the French army’s near-destruction indicates a massive tactical failure. Marshal Bugeaud later described the battle as “the grave that nearly swallowed our conquest.”

== Legacy ==
The battle became a potent symbol of anti-colonial resistance in Algerian national memory. It was memorialized in oral histories, songs, and later nationalist narratives. In French accounts, it remained a cautionary episode illustrating the perils of underestimating indigenous resistance.

== See also ==
- ʿAbd al-Qādir ibn Muḥyī al-Dīn
- Treaty of Tafna
- French conquest of Algeria
- Battle of Sikkak (1836)
- Emirate of Mascara
