= Bertrand Clauzel =

French soldier (1772–1842)

Bertrand Clauzel M.F.
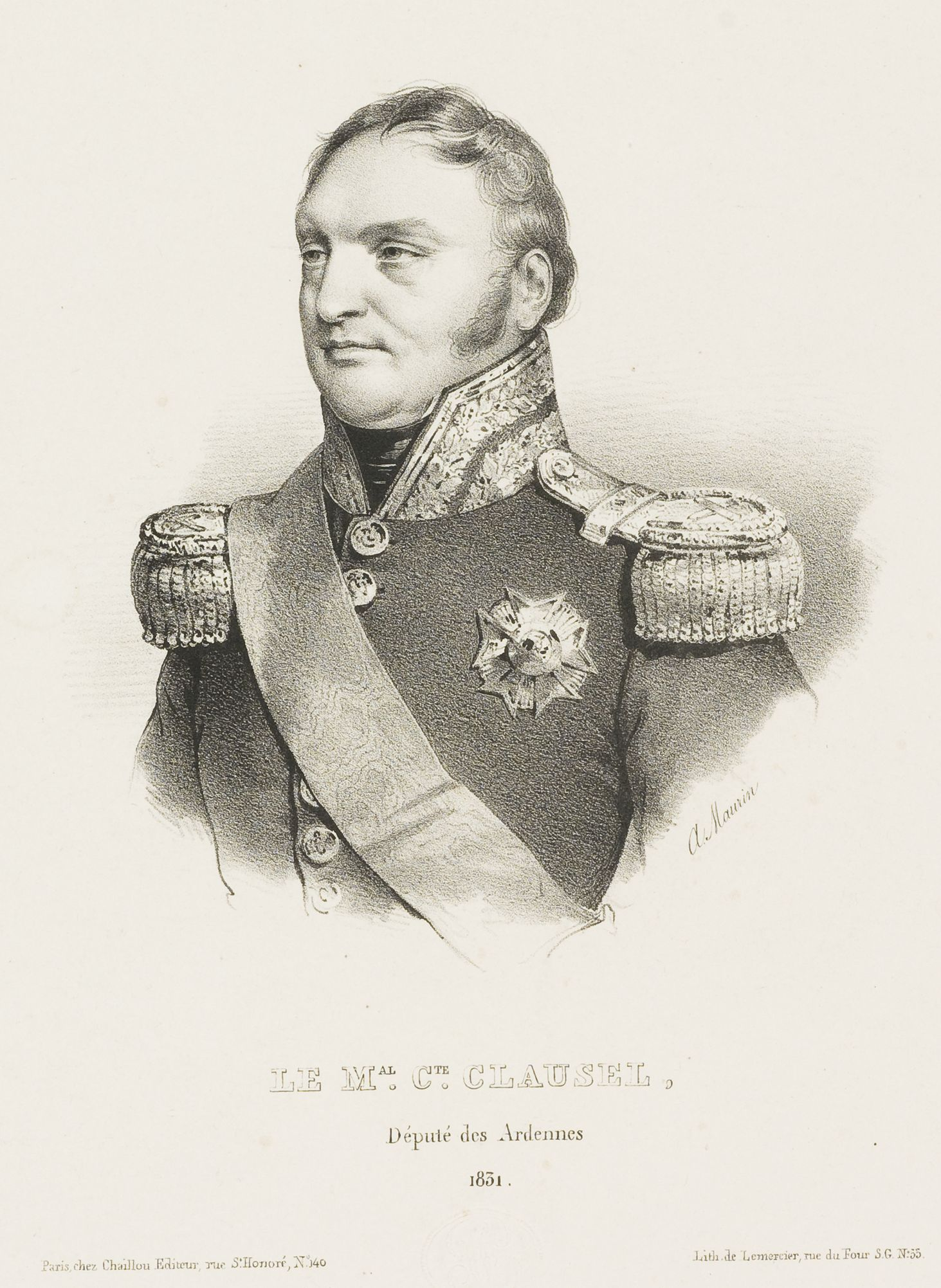
- Born: 12 December 1772; Mirepoix, County of Foix, France
- Died: 21 April 1842 (aged 69) Haute-Garonne, France
- Allegiance: France
- Service years: 1791–1837
- Rank: Marshal of France
- Conflicts: French Revolutionary Wars; Napoleonic War; Peninsular War; Battle of Salamanca; Battle of Roncesvalles; French conquest of Algeria; Battle of Constantine

Bertrand, Comte Clauzel (French pronunciation: [bɛʁtʁɑ̃ kɔ̃t klozɛl]; 12 December 1772 – 21 April 1842), was a French soldier who served in the Revolutionary and Napoleonic wars. He saw service in the Low Countries, the Italian Peninsula, Haiti, and the Iberian Peninsula, where he achieved short periods of independent command.

Clauzel spent the years 1815–1820 in exile in the United States before returning to France and becoming politically active in the republican and liberal opposition to the absolutist governments of Charles X.

Clauzel would later become a Marshal of France under the Orléans monarchy, following the July Revolution. Clauzel would return to active service in the French conquest of Algeria, first during the initial French expedition and later as governor. Napoleon listed Clauzel amongst his most skilful generals.

== Early life and family ==
Bertrand Clauzel was born on the 12 of December 1772 in Mirepoix, in the County of Foix.

Bertrand's father, Gabriel Clauzel, was a bankrupt wholesale merchant who had been disinherited by his own father. Gabriel had embraced the Revolution and served as a member of the Committee of Surveillance of Mirepoix. A deputy to the National Convention would later write that "his presence alone frightens the enemies of the new regime."

Bertrand joined the Mirepoix National Guard at the end of July 1789; the Guard was deployed by his father Gabriel to invest the episcopal palace of Mirepoix and harass the bishop in 1790.

In his extended family Bertrand had an uncle, Jean-Baptiste Clauzel, who was a politician in Ariège during the revolutionary period.

== Military career (1791–1809) ==
=== Early military career ===
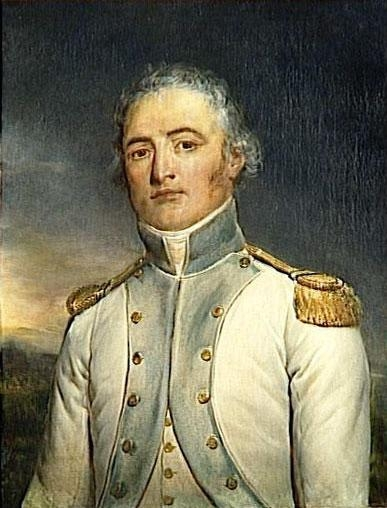
Clauzel, as a Captain of the 43rd Line Infantry Regiment in 1792, by Georges Rouget

Clauzel enlisted in the 43rd Infantry as one of the volunteers of 1791. He saw service in the first campaign of the French Revolutionary Wars. Having distinguished himself repeatedly on the northern frontier with the 43rd Line Infantry Regiment (1792–1793) and then in the eastern Pyrénées (1793–1794), Clauzel was made a chef de bataillon. Clauzel would also be given the honour of bringing twenty four flags taken from the Spanish back to Paris to present to the National Convention.

=== Italian campaigns ===
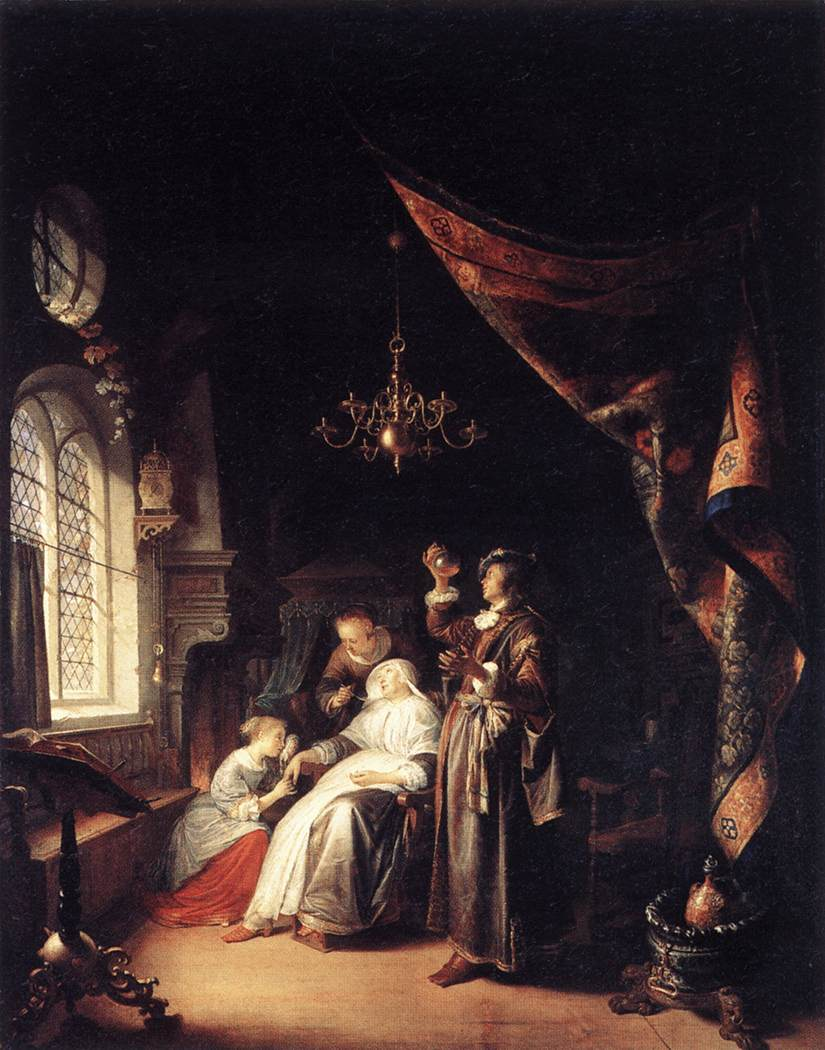
The Woman with Dropsy, the painting was gifted to Clauzel to the Louvre Museum, Gerard Dou (1663)

In 1798, Clauzel became the chief of staff to the division of General Emmanuel de Grouchy within the Army of Italy. In this role, he negotiated the abdication of the King of Sardinia in December 1798 from his mainland territories, namely Piedmont (and associated lands in northern Italy).

As part of the negotiations, Clauzel sought noble hostages, to ensure the terms of the abdication were honoured. Clauzel did not succeed instead, returning with the Woman with Dropsy, a painting by the Dutch master Gerard Dou. Clauzel would donate it to the Louvre where it remains today^{(November 2025)}.

Clauzel's efforts were well regarded by his superiors, with Grouchy writing to General Barthélemy Catherine Joubert, then chief of the Army of Italy that:

"my adjutant-general (Clauzel), who, in this instance, supported me with zeal, energy, and devotion"

Clauzel was rewarded in 1799 with a promotion to général de brigade on 5 February. In this rank, he continued to serve in Italy, where he won great distinction at the battles of Trebbia and Novi. At Novi, Clauzel fought on the left wing of the army, initially helping to stabilise it against the Austrian attack, but managing to withdraw his own brigade after the enemy breakthrough enveloped much of the French left wing, trapping them against the Bormida River.

Clauzel took command of the 4th Division under General Louis-Gabriel Suchet in 1800, taking part in the Siege of Genoa. Clauzel's division saw heavy fighting as delaying actions were fought through mountain passes. During the campaign, he seized the redoubt of Melogno and participated in the attack on (Monte-San-Giacomo). Then, as the Army of Michael von Melas pushed towards the city, he endured the starvation of the siege before a negotiated surrender led to the armies repatriation to France. Later in December 1800, Clauzel fought at Pozzolo.

=== Expedition to Saint-Domingue and return to Europe ===
The Treaty of Amiens enabled Napoleon to organise the Leclerc expedition to reassert French control in the lucrative colony of Saint-Domingue following the Haitian Revolution. Clauzel seized Fort-Dauphin in December 1802, and became commander at Cap Français with a promotion to général de division.

During his time in Le Cap, he purchased a house previously owned by Toussaint Louverture, at auction. Clauzel invoked this purchase, during a later corruption controversy over property in Algeria, as a model purchase that furthered French national interests encouraging stability in the fragile colony.

General Charles Leclerc died of yellow fever in 1803, under the command of Leclerc's successor, Donatien-Marie-Joseph de Vimeur, vicomte de Rochambeau, Clauzel became disillusioned due to Rochambeau's use of extreme violence and indiscriminate killing in an attempt to reassert French control. Clauzel worked with Général de brigade Pierre Thouvenot at first to try and influence Rochambeau before they eventually conspired to overthrow Rochambeau and exile him. Rochambeau learned of the plot and, in September 1803, ordered both Clauzel and Thouvenot arrested and deported. The frigate La Surveillante, carrying Clauzel was shipwrecked off the coast of Florida. He survived the wreck and made his way to New York, where he obtained passage to France.

After his return to France, he was in almost continuous service in a number of coastal garrisons that saw no action. In 1806 when he was sent to the army of Naples, and made him a Grand Officer of the Légion d'honneur. In 1808–1809, he was under the command of Marshal Auguste de Marmont in Dalmatia, and at the close of 1809, Clauzel was assigned to the Army of Portugal under Marshal André Masséna.

== The Peninsular War (1809–1814) ==
Clauzel initially commanded a division in the Army of Portugal during the Peninsular War. During the Siege of Aslorga, he defeated and drove back the Spanish corps positioned at Villa Franca into Galicia. Then at the Battle of Subiaco, he resisted a vastly superior enemy. These actions set conditions for the subsequent Torres Vedras campaign. Masséna's failures saw him replaced by Marmont, under whom Clauzel worked to re-establish the discipline, efficiency, and mobility of the army, which had suffered severely in the retreat from Torres Vedras.

=== Salamanca: "a grand attempt to retrieve the battle" ===
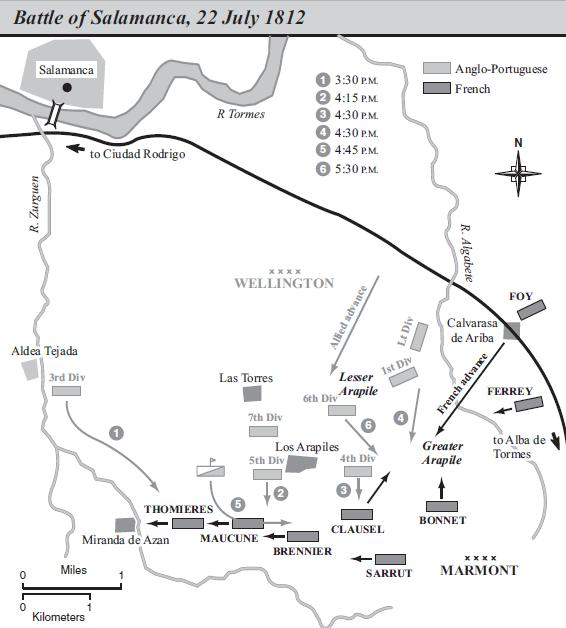
Map showing major troop movements at the Battle of Salamanca

After the failed invasion of Portugal in 1812, the French concentrated their forces to besiege Valencia and withdrew other units in preparation for the invasion of Russia. This left other areas of the Spanish theatre stripped of troops. General Lord Wellington, having previously secured key fortresses at the Spanish–Portuguese border, opted to attack, threatening the northern road connecting Madrid to Burgos and then on to France.

Marmont initially retreated in the face of Wellington's superior forces, but once reinforced, he attempted to force the Anglo-Portuguese army to retreat or give battle. Marmont attempted this by marching to turn Wellington's flank, and threaten its lines of communication back to Portugal; it was these manoeuvres that instigated the Battle of Salamanca.

As the battle began, Clauzel's division was initially positioned behind the French left wing. After the rout of Jean Guillaume Barthélemy Thomières's division, Clauzel's division advanced to reinforce the faltering line. With both Marshal Marmont and General Jean Pierre François Bonet wounded, Clauzel, as the most senior officer available, assumed command of the French forces under challenging circumstances. Marmont's attempt to flank had exposed the divisions led by Thomières and Antoine Louis Popon de Maucune to an Anglo-Portuguese assault. According to Lewis Butler, Clauzel's subsequent actions constituted "a grand attempt to retrieve the battle".

The battlefield was characterised by two small hills, the lesser and the greater Arapiles. The lesser Arapile was situated at the heart of the Anglo-Portuguese army's position, while the greater Arapile occupied a central position in the French army's deployment. Both hills served as crucial points, securing the flanks of each army's formations. Clauzel's strategy aimed to counter the attack on his left flank by launching an assault on the Anglo-Portuguese centre to capture the lesser Arapile.

The offensive proved unsuccessful as it was met with staunch resistance from fresh enemy troops. The retreat and resulting disarray among the French forces left them vulnerable to subsequent assaults on their left and centre. The battle culminated in a resounding defeat for the French, with Butler noting that the engagements had rendered the divisions of Maucune, Thomières, and Clauzel incapable of functioning as cohesive military units.

Lievyns reports that Clauzel became known as the "unfortunate hero of the Arapiles" following the battle.

=== The Castile Campaign ===
The retreat from Salamanca posed significant challenges to Clauzel due to the substantial losses suffered by the French army. Initially, Maximilien Sébastien Foy's division, the only French unit relatively unscathed, provided cover as the rear guard. However, it suffered a decisive defeat the following day at the Battle of García Hernández. Clauzel managed to salvage what remained of the Army of Portugal as he retreated north of Burgos.

The historian Mullié reports this retreat by the Army of Portugal was compared to the actions of Marshal Michel Ney during the retreat to Russia.

Burgos was besieged by Wellington before Clauzel could regroup his forces. With reinforcements from General Joseph Souham, Clauzel spent some time recovering from a gunshot wound to his right foot. Clauzel later resumed divisional command in the subsequent campaign, which saw Wellington retreat back to Ciudad Rodrigo. Despite Wellington's return to his initial position, Clauzel's costly defeat at Salamanca compelled French forces in Spain to focus their efforts against Wellington, leading to the liberation of Andalusia, Extremadura, and Asturias by Spanish forces.

=== The rest of the War of the Sixth Coalition ===
In early 1813, Clauzel assumed command of the Army of the North in Spain. During the Battle of Vitoria, Clauzel and the bulk of his army were a day's march away and unable to aid Jean-Baptiste Jourdan, contributing to the latter's defeat. In the days after Vitoria, Clauzel's army was separated from Jourdan's retreating army and risked being cut off, but Clauzel conducted a skilful retreat through Jaca to concentrate French forces.

After Jourdan was replaced, Clauzel continued in service under the command of Marshal Jean-de-Dieu Soult. Clauzel continued to see action throughout the rest of the Peninsular War and the 1814 campaign in south-west France, seeing action at the major battles of Nivelle, Orthez, and Toulouse as well as personally securing a minor French victory at Aire.

Wellington would communicate news of the Emperor's abdication to French forces in the south in the aftermath of Toulouse. Clauzel was the first to vote at a meeting of generals, that no consideration should be given to such a notification until it was made by the Emperor himself, this proposal was accepted.

== Political life ==
=== Changing loyalties ===
Following the Bourbon Restoration in 1814, he reluctantly submitted to the restored monarchy, but swiftly joined Napoleon upon his return to France. Throughout the Hundred Days, he held command along the Pyrenees. While there were no major battles on the Pyrenean front before Napoleon surrendered, Clauzel earned the particular ire of French royalists with his actions in chasing the Duchess of Angoulême out of Bordeaux.

=== Exile in the United States ===
Clauzel was named among those who had "attacked the person" of the King in the edict of 24 July 1815, by their participation in the Hundred Days. Clauzel left Bordeaux and escaped police detection as he fled through France, aided by anonymous letters sent to police which reported his whereabouts to be in the region of Foix, where he had grown up. Exiled initially in Belgium, he understood the great legal danger he was in and set off for the United States, arriving in Brooklyn on 29 August 1815.

Clauzel's fears were justified, and he would later be condemned to death in absentia. In the Americas, French societies of exiles organised attempts to purchase land in various countries. Not all of them with entirely peaceful and commercial intentions. The restored Bourbons worried that Clauzel, amongst other exiles such as Joseph Bonaparte and Grouchy, was assembling Napoleonic loyalists in the Americas with a view to freeing Napoleon from exile on Saint Helena through the hiring of American privateers. Once free, a range of ambitious schemes were dreamt up for Napoleon to join in various Spanish American independence wars to create a new empire. Clauzel was not directly implicated in such schemes, but in one case, an expedition was organised by Lakanal, and he did have letters addressed to him.

Clauzel was amongst those who settled in the Vine and Olive Colony in modern-day Alabama. He was known to tend a vegetable garden and sell produce at the local market. During his time in exile, Clauzel was a personal friend of former General Grouchy.

=== Return to France ===
Clauzel seized the first opportunity to return when he was pardoned in 1820. He assisted the Orléanist Liberal opposition in France, serving in the Chamber of Deputies for Ariège in 1827, then for Ardennes in 1830.

His candidacy in the Ardennes constituency was instigated by the entreaties of a former non-commissioned officer who had served under him at Salamanca, what had post-war become a wealthy and influential elector in the area.

He sat on the left and voted for the Address of the 221, which expressed disapproval of the ultra-royalist administration. Following the July Revolution of 1830, he promptly assumed a military command, being appointed the commander of French forces in Algeria.

=== General in Algeria ===
The invasion of Algiers had begun under the government of the Bourbon absolutist King Charles in a late measure to shore up popular support for his rule. With the July Revolution, the new constitutional monarchy was governed by liberals who had opposed the Algiers expedition. Victory by French forces at the Battle of Staouéli and the fall of Algiers did not save the absolutist government; however, French success was publicly popular, and the new government was careful to not turn public opinion against itself by abandoning Algeria. The political imperative in Paris was to secure both the loyalty of the troops in Algeria and, begrudgingly, the conquest, albeit with a reduced size for the expedition. Clauzel was sent to replace Legitimist General Louis-Auguste-Victor de Bourmont as commander in chief of the invasion of Algeria.

Under Bourmont, French forces had militarily defeated the Deylik, taking control of many major ports across the country. In the case of Oran and Bône these would be latter abandoned on hearing of the overthrow of Charles X in France. Bourmont even intended to lead his troops back to France to restore the Bourbons, but, with little support from the rank and file, he opted instead to go into exile in Spain. Clauzel therefore inherited a situation in flux; many units needed new, politically loyal officers, and the size of the expedition was reduced by 50%. Nevertheless, Clauzel oversaw the re-occupation of Oran and Bône but was unable to secure the Algerian interior.

Chronological map showing the extent of French holdings in Algeria

Given his experience fighting during the insurgency in Spain, and mindful of the numerous grievances of Algerians against Ottoman rule, Clauzel attempted to steer French policy away from the likelihood of a protracted engagement. Clauzel's approach involved a political settlement between the French, who would take over as suzerain over the Husaynid rulers of Tunis, who would rule much of Algeria beyond some major ports left to the French. This was done in a system similar to that of the status of Algeria under the Ottoman Empire, but with France as overlord. Clauzel's attempts collapsed, his actions lacked sanction from his superiors in Paris. The arrival of a 500-strong Tunisian contingent led to unrest in Oran, and, having lost support, he was replaced.

Clauzel acted in the absence of orders from the War Ministry, and while debates were live in parliament about what to do with the territories in North Africa, he set out a clearly defined goal for France in Algeria that matched the military forces available to him given the limited political will in the early 1830s for a large and expensive commitment of troops. The invocation of the Tunisians failed to account for simmering tensions emanating in Algerian society that had been present before the French arrived and were manifested in the unrest that accompanied their arrival.

Elsewhere, Clauzel was an enthusiastic supporter of the first attempt at agricultural colonialism in Algeria, especially a model farm in the Mitidja. Clauzel would also set up a company to acquire agricultural land and enable settlement by Europeans.

=== Political activity (1831–1835) ===
Simultaneous with his removal, Clauzel was appointed a Marshal of France in February 1831. In his absence, Algeria saw a small revolving door of successors to Clauzel as governor general. Combined with vacillation in France, this resulted in 'restricted occupation' in Algeria to become the French goal, in the words of Charles-André Julien, "less a matter of policy than of an absence of policy".

For nearly four years thereafter, he advocated on behalf of Algerian colonists to the Chamber of Deputies, and defended his actions while in military command in Algeria. He advocated for continued occupation, arguing that France's "national honour would be tainted" by withdrawal, not only on account of such an event but also because he believed that France's withdrawal would lead to the massacre of the Jewish population of Algeria.

Clauzel wrote and advised the National Assembly and the government on what policy France should take to secure her interests now that the occupation had become permanent, as well as providing information about the physical and human geography of Algeria. Amongst these suggestions was support to allow Jews to hold positions in local governance and the judiciary, which they had been excluded from under Deylical rule.

Drawing on his own experiences farming in Alabama, Clauzel publicised Algeria as a "Mediterranean Alabama" – suggesting that the climate would be suitable for the cultivation of cotton, sugar, and other colonial produce that France would otherwise have to import.

His first posting to Algeria would also seem Clauzel embroiled in a controversy over property rights over a number of properties in Algeria including the Maison-Carrée and the Ferme de l’Agha, a property that before the conquest had belonged to the Agha of a company of Janissary cavalry. The farm was seized by French forces under General Loverdo [Fr] immediately after the fall of Algiers, it was converted into a military hospital. Yet later Clauzel would purchase the farm, despite the fact that as commander of French forces he had forbid the purchase of any “corporation property” (biens de corporation) - that is land belonging to the Deylick, waqf endowments for mosques or religious schools or a military estate.

Critics accused Clauzel of abusing his position to enrich himself with property. Investigations into the legality of property transactions made during and just after the conquest including Clauzel's were undertaken by the National Assembly. Clauzel defended himself publicly, relying upon his extensive military record such as his time in Italy (refusing gifts from the King of Sardinia beyond a painting he donated. As well as the expedition to Saint-Domingue, where he was offered houses and plantations as well as local funding for entertainment expenses at his residence by civic organisations, but refused them all instead advocating the need for funding new defences for the town.

Clauzel argued that his purchases were for public good - aimed at encouraging colonialism, stability, and trust and emphasized that, despite opportunities for personal enrichment, he remained relatively poor.

He argued that contested properties were either regulated by official decree, with purchases coming before his own decree to forbid sales, or authorised by the Minister after his departure. His character and prior public service were central to his defence against accusations of misappropriation. The estates would stay in Clauzel's ownership but, the farm had suffered damage from years of use by soldiers quartered there.

=== Return to Algeria ===
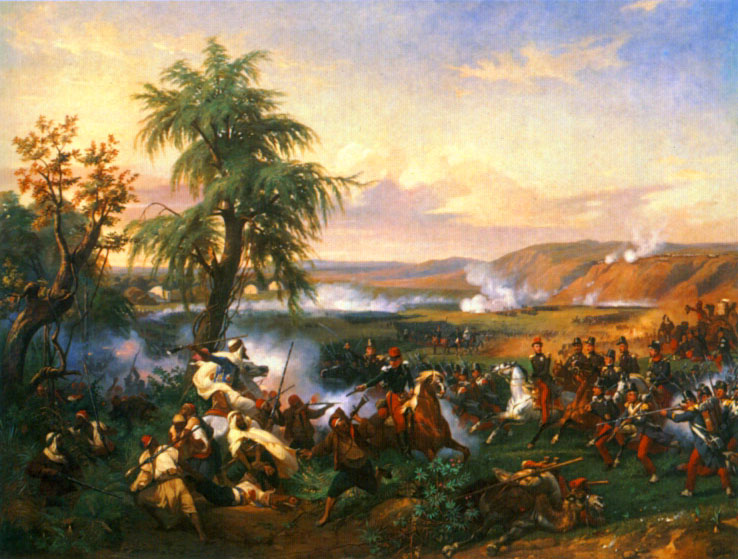
Battle of Habra, Horace Vernet

By summer 1835, an uneasy truce had broken down, and hostilities between France and Abd al-Qadir erupted as Makhzen tribes from around Oran sought French protection. On 28 June, a French column was surprised between the low hills around Maqta. The disastrous Battle of Maqta provoked popular outrage in France, and the incumbent governor, General Trèzel, was replaced by Clauzel, who once again returned to North Africa.

Despite early successes, such as at the Battle of Habra and the capture of Mascara, both in December 1835, and then Tlemcen in January 1836, Clauzel struggled to land a decisive blow against Abd al-Qadir. These victories were, spoiled as Clauzel by political missteps, such as his imposition of a massive indemnity upon Tlemcen, thereby failing to turn his conquests into allies, and by Clauzel's inability to bring Abd al-Qadir to battle. The French presence in the Algerian hinterland remained extremely limited.

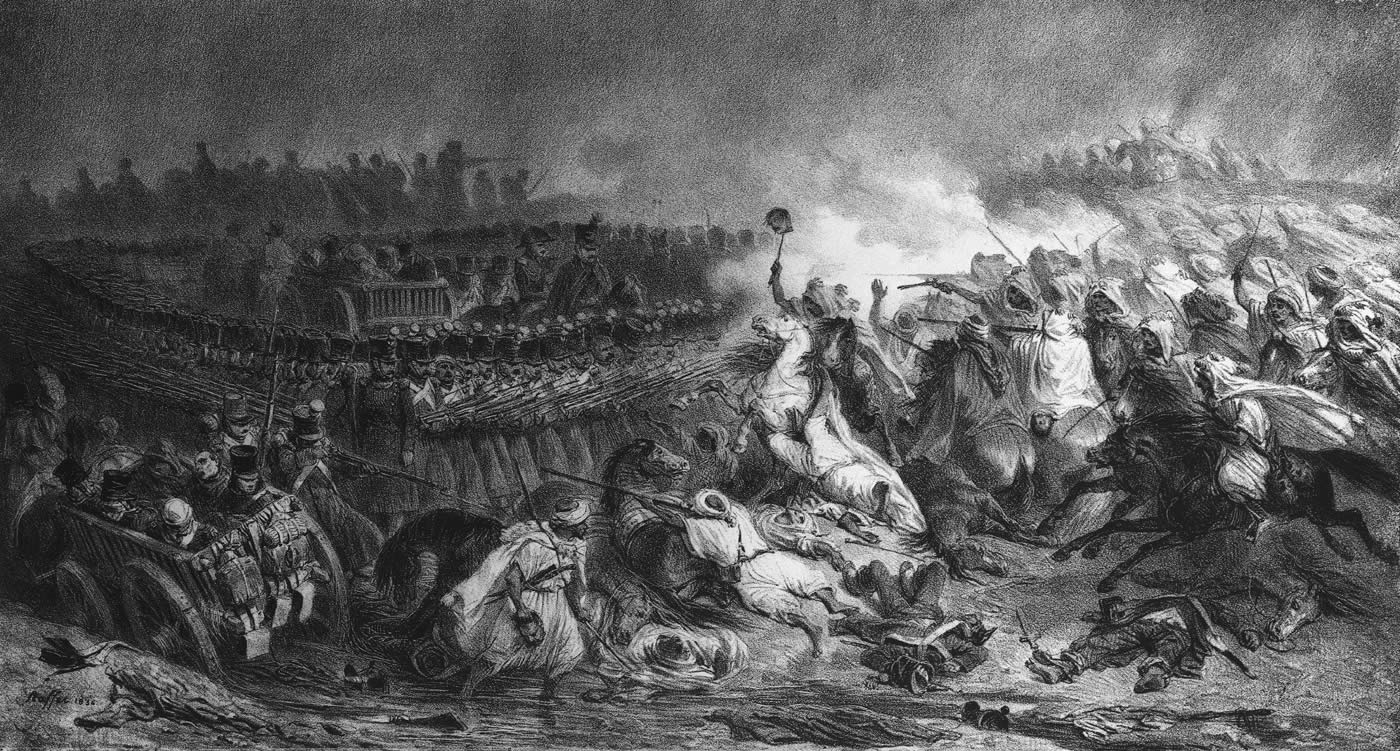
A French infantry square covering Clauzel's retreat at the end of the 1836 campaign to take Constantine

In the western theatre of Algeria, it took until the summer of 1836 for the French to win a decisive battle against Al-Qadir's forces at the Sikkak River, where a ten-thousand-strong contingent of regulars and tribal warriors was routed by General Thomas-Robert Bugeaud. In the east, Clauzel mustered forces to strike at the Beylik of Constantine, with financial and logistical support from the Oran-based merchant Jacob Lasry. However, due to adverse weather and determined resistance from Ahmad Bey, the 1836 attempt to seize Constantine failed. Public and political opinion turned on Clauzel, leading to his recall in February 1837. With French policy shifting to a policy of 'restricted, progressive and peaceful' occupation. This entailed making peace with Abd al-Qadir's sovereignty with the Treaty of Tafna so they could concentrate forces to avenge Clauzel's defeat. Clauzel's successor was General Charles Marie Denys de Damrémont, who would die during the ultimately successful siege of Constantine later in 1837.

=== Retirement and legacy ===
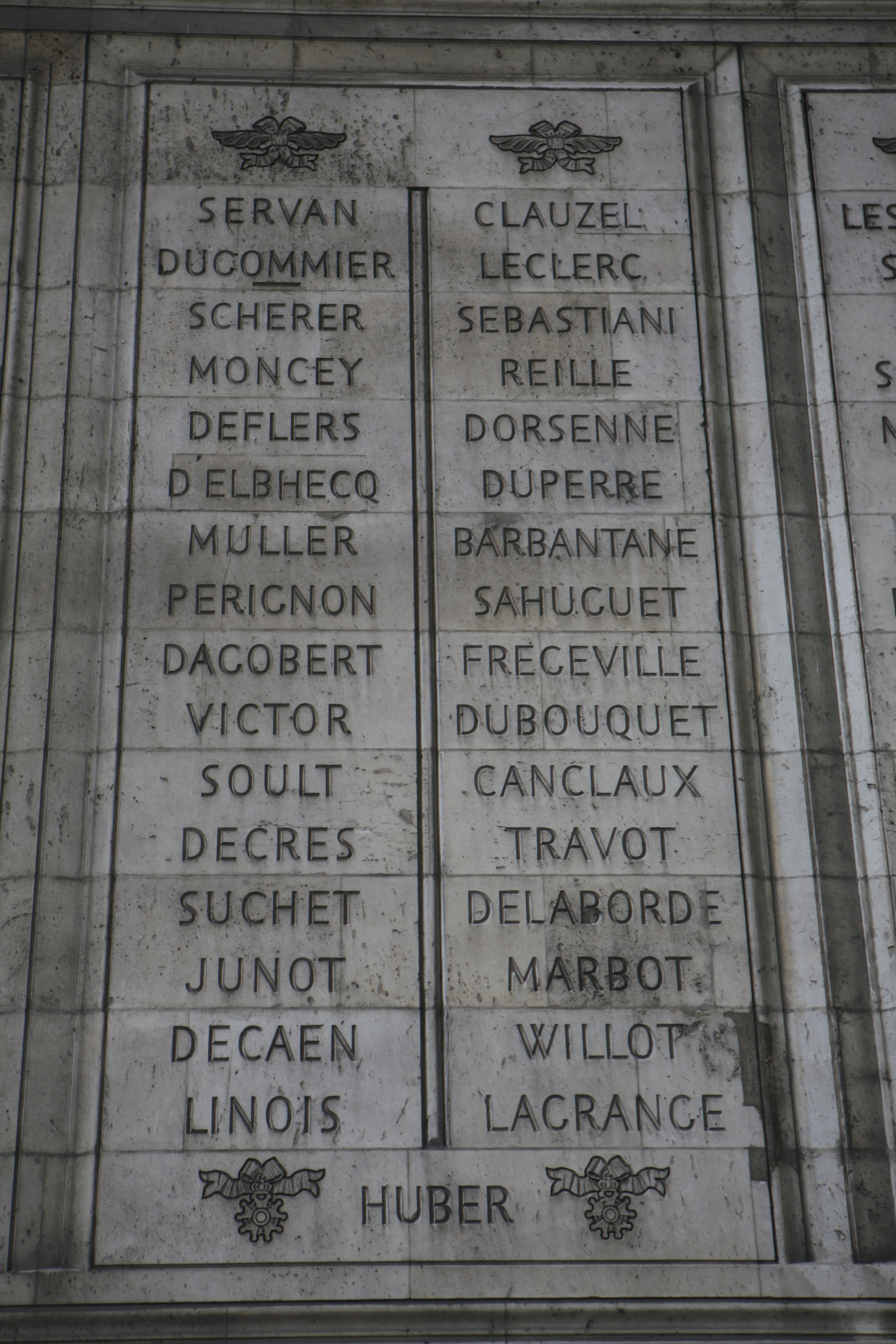
Columns 33 and 34 on the west side of the Arc de Triomphe

Upon his return to France, he retired from active service, vigorously defending his actions before the deputies before withdrawing from public life. Historian James McDougall argues in his History of Algeria that General Bugeaud's actions to conclude a treaty subsequent to Clauzel's removal with Abd al-Qadir were short-sighted, and only gave a defeated enemy time to regroup while extracting meaningless concessions but this course was necessary if France was to strike at Constantine with the limited forces in theatre. McDougall also argues Clauzel's arrangements with Tunisian rulers failed to completely understand Algeria as a unique political entity with its own challenges. Other assessments note the lack of political support in France which limited the success of Clauzel's actions in Algeria.

Clauzel lived in retirement until his death from apoplexy at Château du Secourieu in Haute-Garonne in 1842.

Because Clauzel donated the Woman with Dropsy, the first painting to be donated to the Louvre, Clauzel's name is at the top of the list on the plaque visible in the rotunda of Apollo.

"Clauzel" is one of 660 names inscribed on the Arc de Triomphe, appearing at the top of column 34 on the west side. When asked on Saint Helena which of his generals was the most skilful, Napoleon named Clauzel along with Marshal Suchet and Étienne Maurice Gérard.

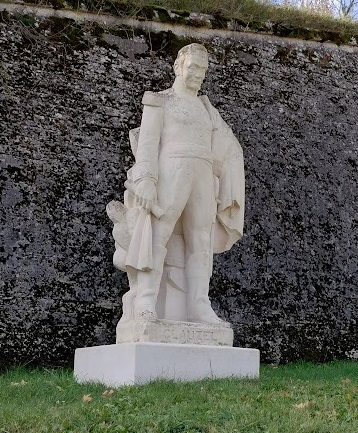
The statue of Clauzel within the Crossroads of the Marshals, at Verdun

There is a statue of Clauzel amongst the Crossroads of the Marshals located at the foot of the walls, of the fortifications at the citadel of Verdun. His statue stands amongst 15 other Marshalls of various periods.

== Honours ==
- Legion of Honour, chevalier on 25 March 1804, commander on 14 June 1804, grand officer on 17 July 1809 and grand cross on 14 February 1815.
- Order of the Reunion grand cross on 3 April 1813.
- Order of Saint Louis chevalier. 1 June 1815.
