= Louis Alexis Desmichels =

Baron Louis Alexis Desmichels
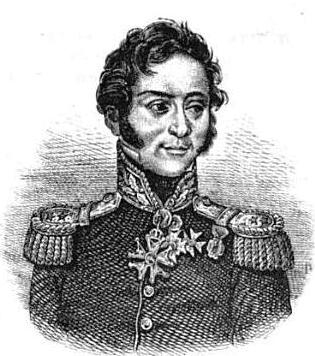
- Born: March 15, 1779; Digne, France
- Died: June 7, 1845 (aged 66); Paris, France
- Military career
- Allegiance: France
- Rank: General Officer

Louis Alexis Desmichels, born in Digne March 15, 1779, died in Paris in 1845, was a French soldier in the French Revolution who became a general under the July Monarchy. He was known for his role in the conquest of Algeria and relations with Emir Abdelkader.

== Biography ==
Desmichels was the commander of the French forces in Oran from 1833 to 1835.

In 1833, Desmichels retook the city of Arzew as part of the French conquest of Algeria. He was party to the Desmichels Treaty in 1834 with Abdelkader, in which the French made major concessions to Abdelkader, but without the knowledge or consent of the French government. However, when the French government learned of the treaty, Desmichels denied its existence.
