= Desmichels Treaty =

1834 treaty between Algeria and France

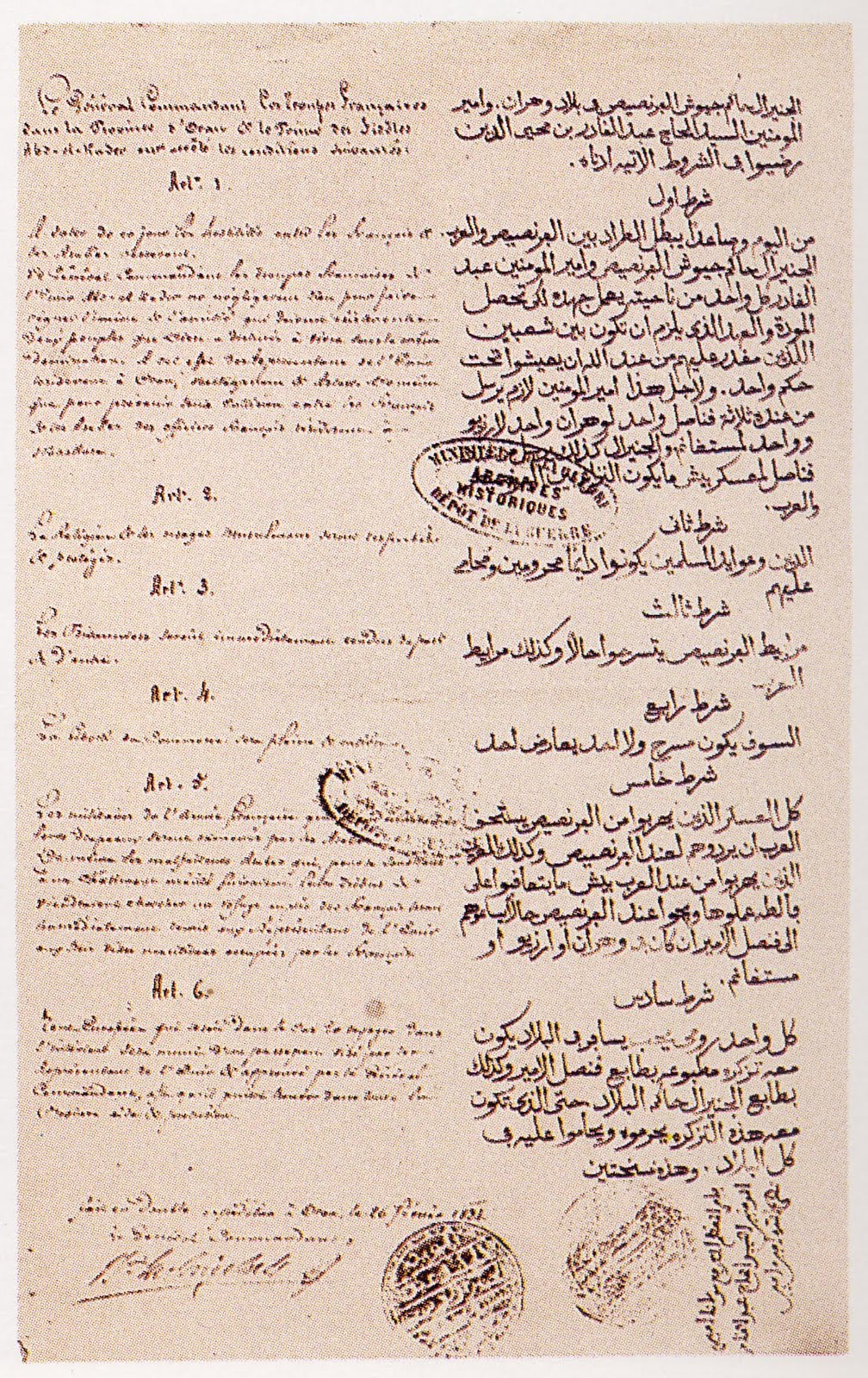

The Treaty of Desmichels, also known as the Desmichels Treaty, was signed on 26 February 1834 by Abd el-Kader and French military officials, led by General Louis Alexis Desmichels. As a result of the agreement, France acknowledged Abd-el-Kader as the bey (governor) of Mascara, as well as the independent sovereign ruler of Oran in Algeria.

== See also ==
- List of treaties
