= Emir Abdelkader University =

University in Constantine, Algeria

Coordinates: 36°20′56.4″N 6°36′15.3″E

Emir Abdelkader University/Jamiaat el-amir abdelkader
- جــامــــــعة الأمير عبد القادر
- Type: Public
- President: Abd Allah Boukhelkhal
- Location: Constantine, Constantine province
- Campus: 20
- Website: http://www.univ-emir.dz/

Emir Abdelkader University of Islamic Sciences (Arabic: جامعة الأمير عبد القادر للعلوم الإسلامية) is a university in Algeria.

== History ==
The establishment of the university, along with the Emir Abdelkader Mosque, has led to a significant number of specialists in Islamic architecture.

== Site ==
The University of Emir Abdelkader is located in the city of Qusanṭīnah, the capital of the Constantine province in eastern Algeria.

== See also ==
- List of Muslim educational institutions
- List of Islamic Universities
