= Emir Abdelkader Mosque =

Mosque in Constantine City, Constantine Province, Algeria

- مسجد الأمير عبد القادر
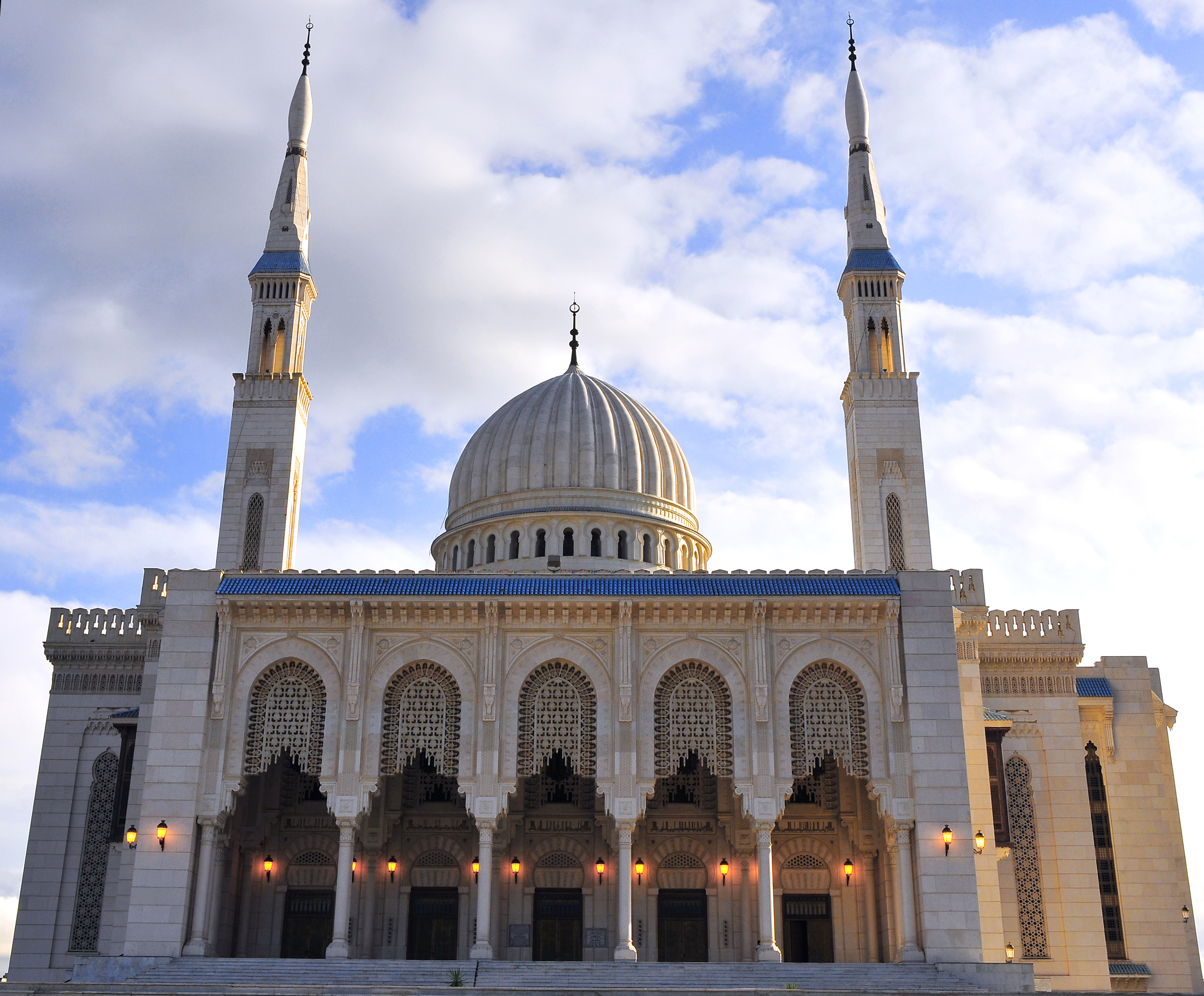

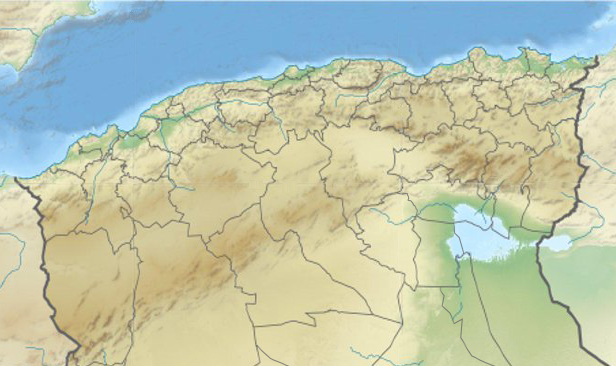
- Location of the mosque in northern Algeria

Religion
- Affiliation: Sunni Islam
- Ecclesiastical or organizational status: Mosque
- Status: Active

Location
- Location: Constantine, Constantine Province
- Country: Algeria
- Interactive map of Emir Abdelkader Mosque
- Coordinates: 36°20′48″N 6°36′11″E

Architecture
- Architect: Mustafa Moussa
- Type: Islamic architecture
- Completed: 1994

Specifications
- Capacity: 15,000 worshippers
- Interior area: 100,000 m^{2} (1,100,000 sq ft)
- Dome: 1
- Dome height (outer): 64 m (210 ft)
- Dome dia. (outer): 20 m (66 ft)
- Minaret: 2
- Minaret height: 107 m (351 ft)
- Site area: c.1 ha (2.5 acres)
- Materials: Marble; granite

The Emir Abdelkader Mosque (Arabic: مسجد الأمير عبد القادر, romanized: Jemaa EL-Emir Abdelkader) is a Sunni mosque located in the city of Constantine, in the Constantine Province of Algeria. It is the second largest mosque in Algeria after Djamaa Al Djazair.

== Overview ==
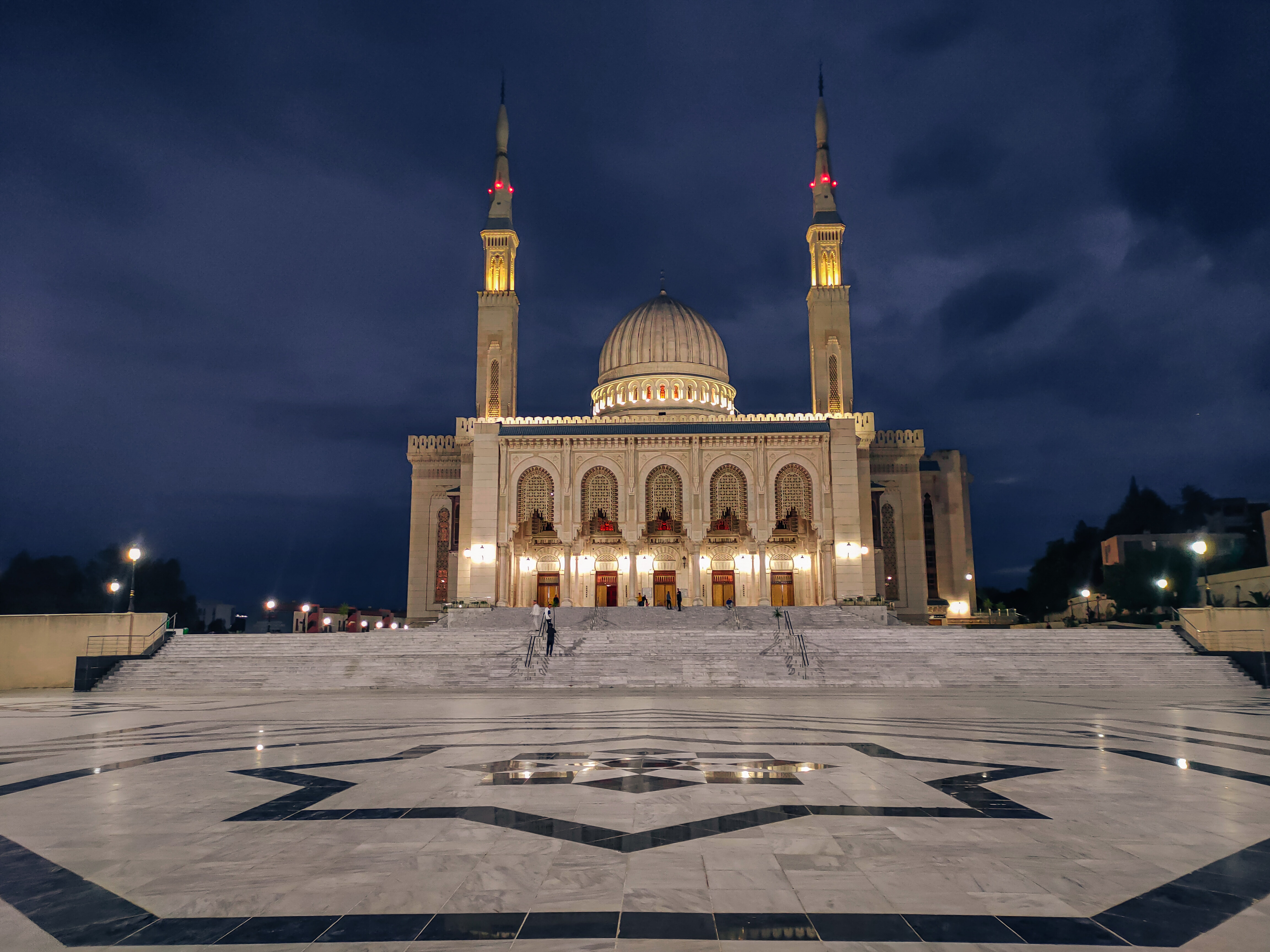
The mosque and expansive sahn, in 2023

Completed in 1994, the mosque was named in honour of Al Amir Abdelkader Ibn Mahyeddine, an Algerian Sufi scholar, religious, and military leader who led a struggle against the French colonial invasion of Algiers in the early 19th century. The establishment of the mosque, along with the Emir Abdelkader University, led to an increase in the number of specialists in Islamic architecture in Constantine. The university and mosque were built with marble and granite. It has two minarets that are 107 metres (351 ft) high and a dome that is 20 metres (66 ft) in diameter.

== Gallery ==
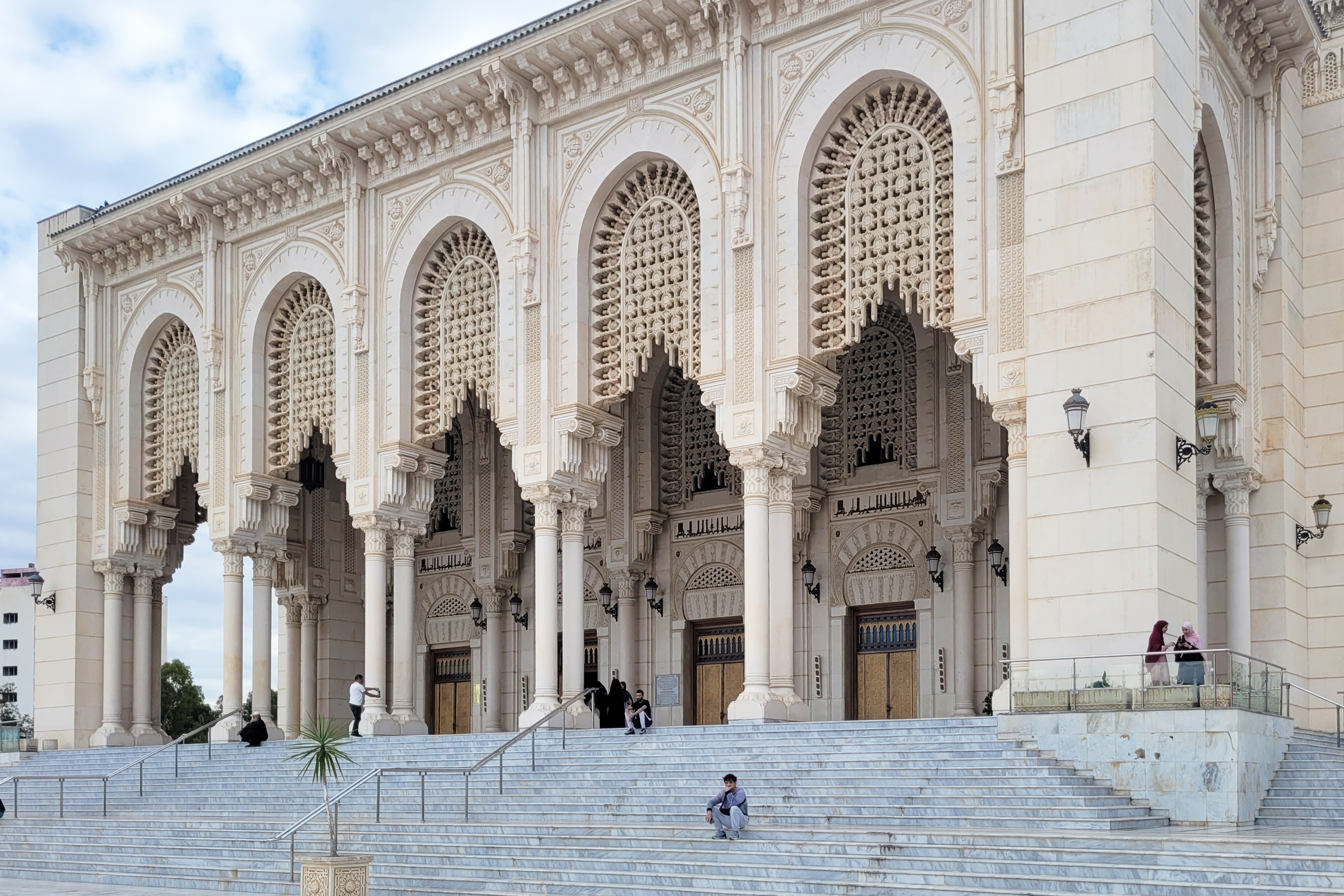
Entrance of the mosque

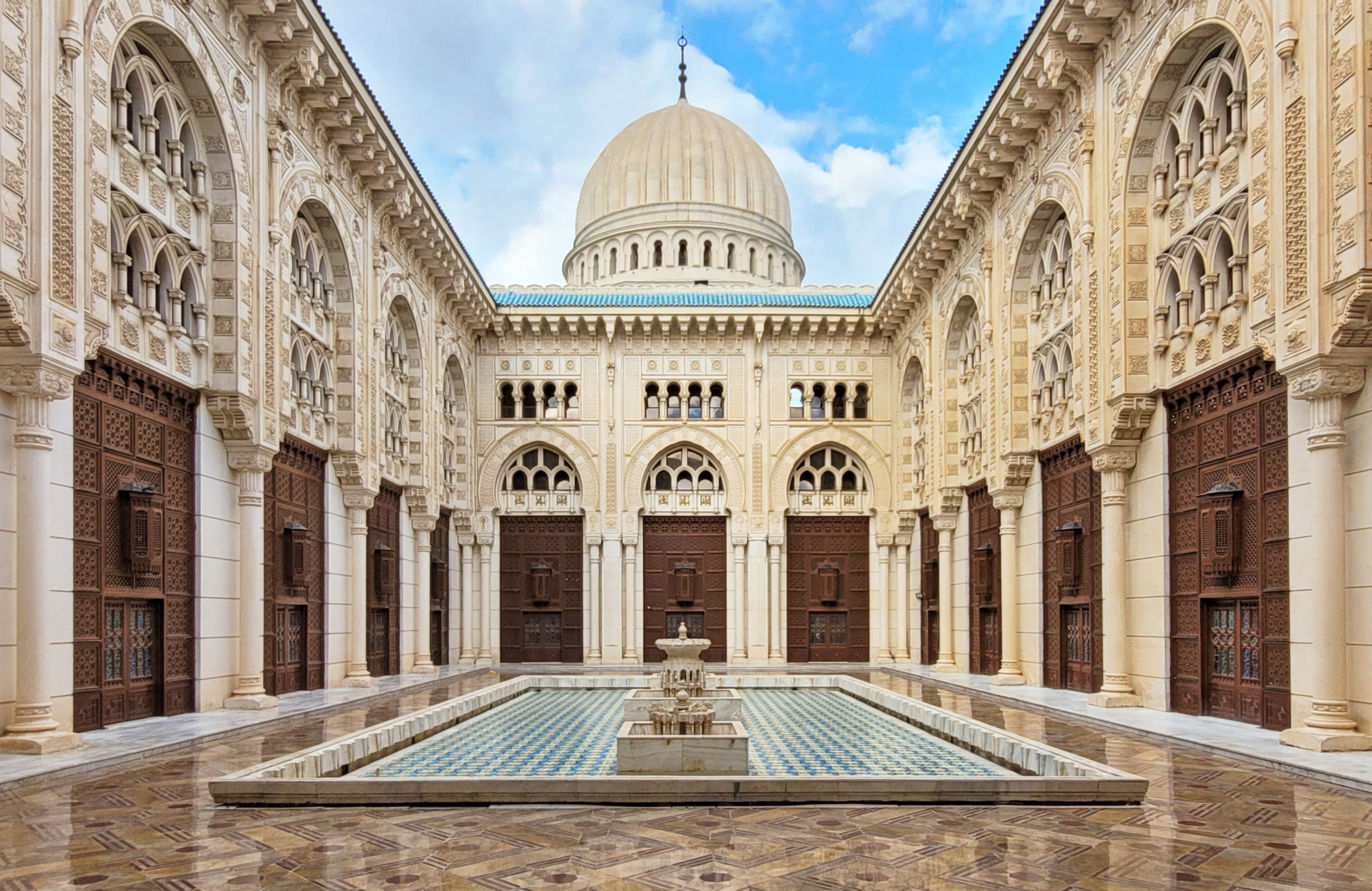
Patio

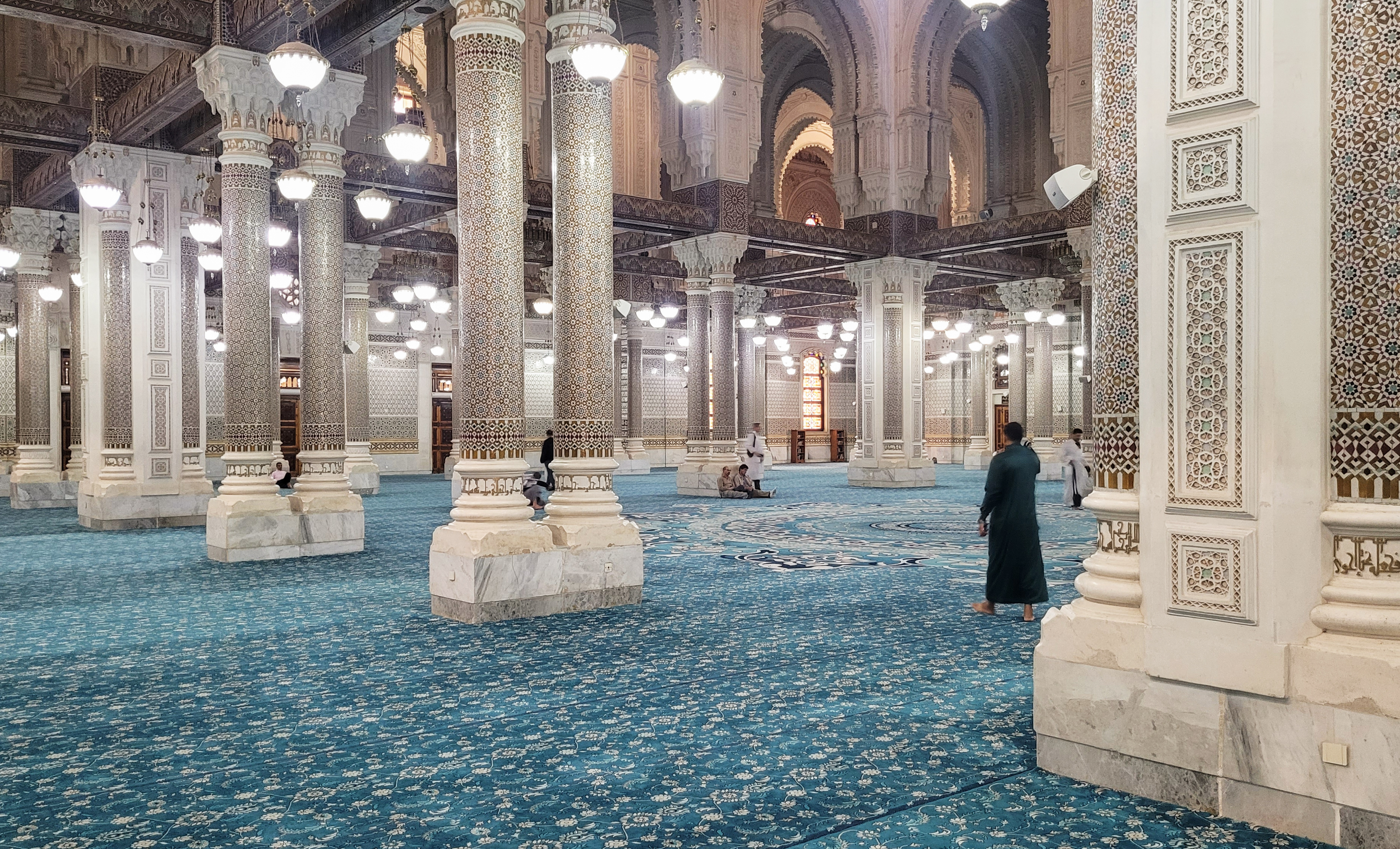
Interior

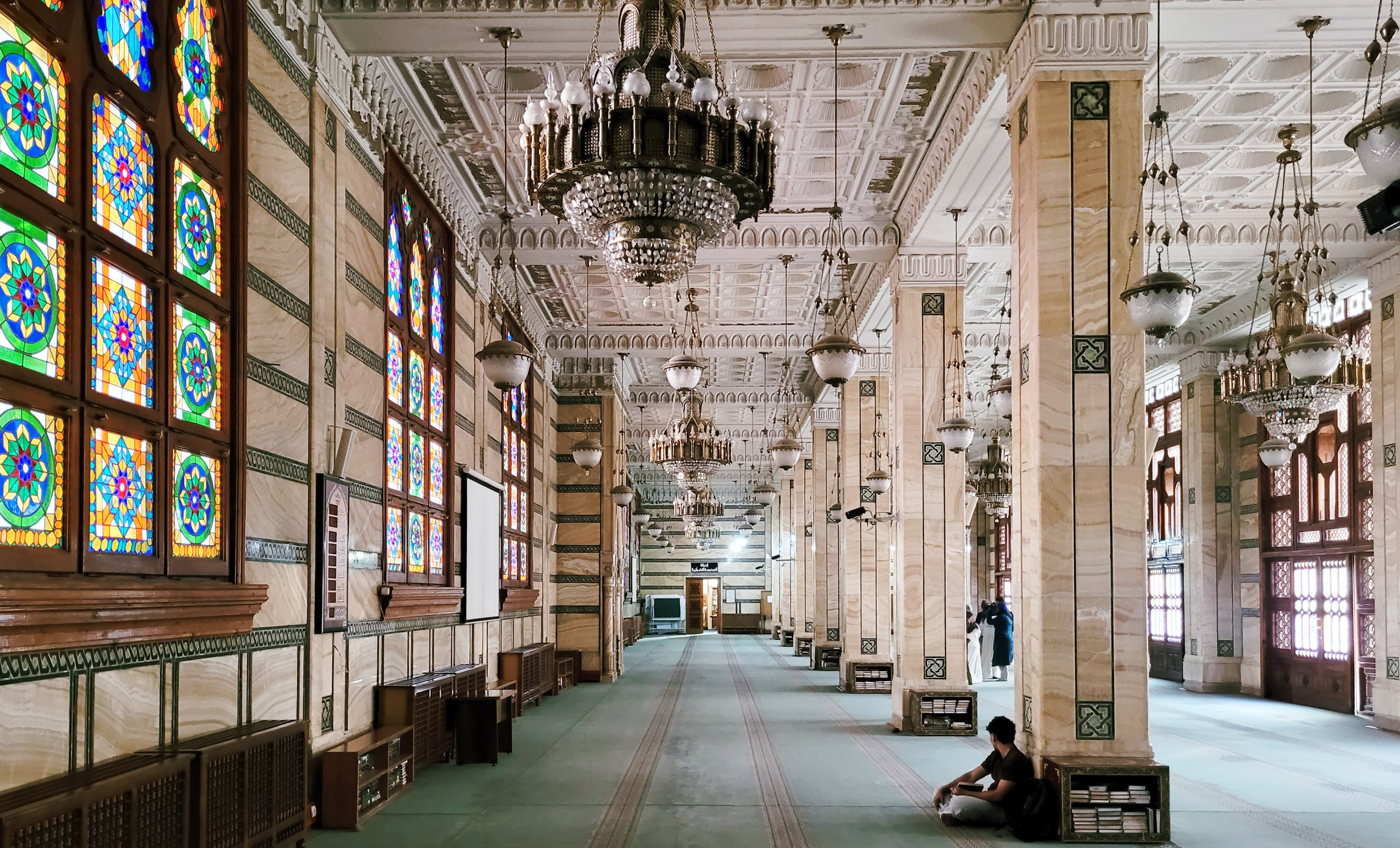
Interior

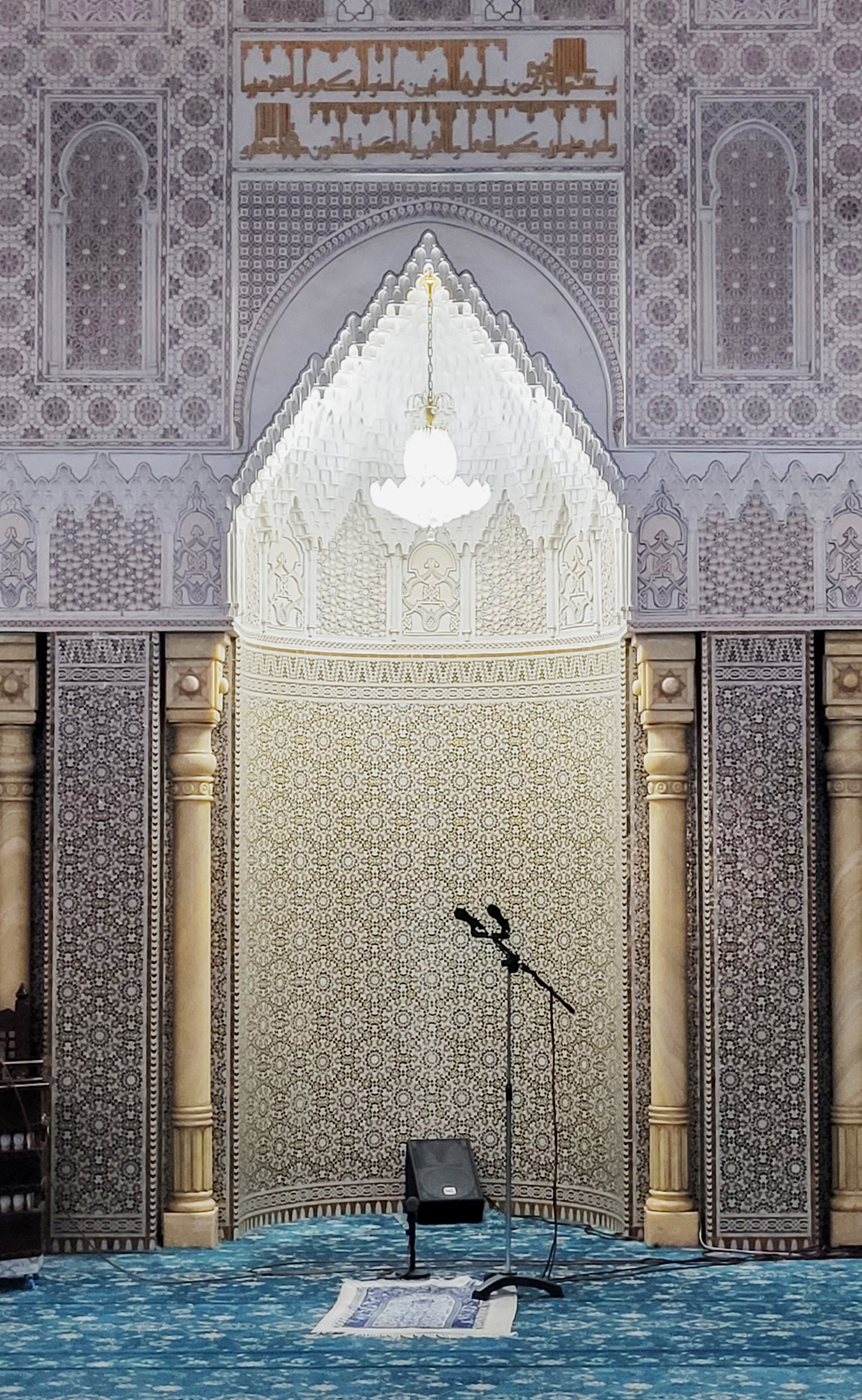
Mihrab

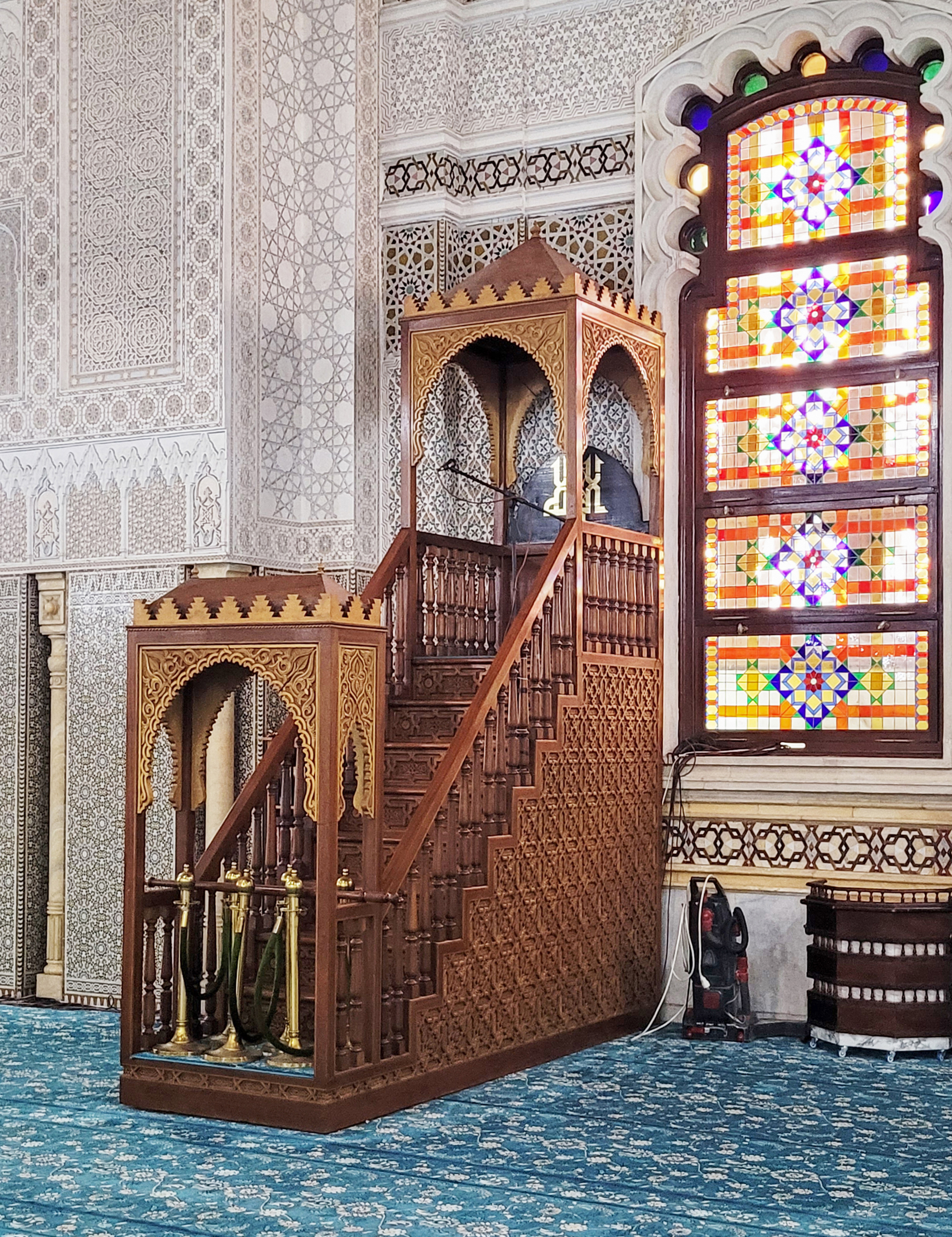
Minbar

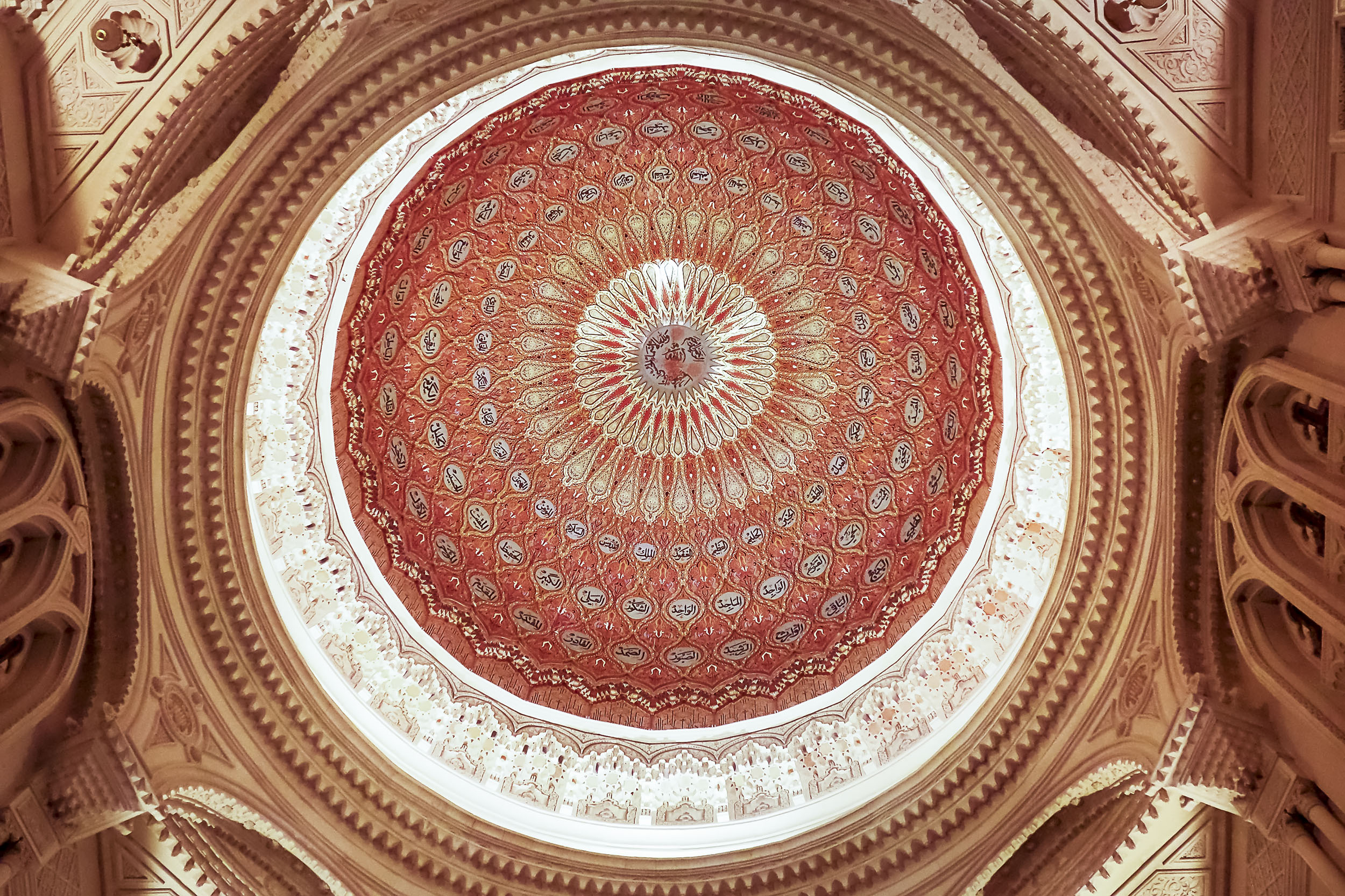
Coupole

== See also ==
- Islam in Algeria
- List of mosques in Algeria
