= List of wars involving Spain =

This list details Spain's involvement in wars and armed conflicts, excluding those fought by its predecessor states or within its territory.

== Catholic Monarchy ==
Conflict	Combatant 1	Combatant 2	Results
Granada War (1482–92): Conclusion of the Reconquista; Location: Iberian Peninsula	Catholic Monarchs of Spain; Military Orders; European crusaders	Emirate of Granada	Victory: Granada annexed; Treaty of Granada (1491)
First Italian War (1494–1498): Battle of Seminara; Location: Italian Peninsula, Mediterranean Sea	League of Venice: Papal States; Republic of Venice; Kingdom of Naples; Kingdoms of Spain; Duchy of Milan; Holy Roman Empire; Republic of Florence; Duchy of Mantua; Kingdom of England (from 1496)	Kingdom of France: (Old Swiss Confederacy) Swiss mercenaries; Duchy of Milan (before 1495)	Victory: Forced French retreat
Spanish conquest of Haiti (1494–1509) Location: Americas, Caribbean Sea, Hispaniola	Crown of Castile	Taínos	Victory
Conquest of Melilla (1497): Part of Spanish campaigns in the Maghreb (1497–1535); Location: North Africa	Castile and Aragon	Wattasid dynasty	Victory
Zayyanid–Iberian conflicts (1415–1543): Battle of Mers-el-Kébir (1501); Capture of Mers-el-Kébir (1505); Battle of Mers-el-Kébir (1507); Spanish conquest of Oran (1509); Spanish expedition to Tlemcen (1535); Spanish expedition to Tlemcen (1543); Part of Spanish campaigns in the Maghreb (1497–1535), Spanish–Ottoman wars and Algerian–Moroccan conflicts; Location: North Africa	Castile and Aragon (since 1497): pro-Spain Algerians; Kingdom of Portugal (until 1501)	Kingdom of Tlemcen: Banu Rashid; Minor support: Regency of Algiers Wattasid dynasty	Pyrrhic Victory: Portuguese withdrawal from Algeria.; Spanish Vassalization of the Kingdom of Tlemcen from Oran consolidated through Abu Abdallah VI, but with instability and hostility from Algiers, Ottomans.
Rebellion of the Alpujarras (1499–1501): part of Mudejar revolts; Location: Iberian Peninsula	Catholic Monarchs of Spain: Kingdom of Granada	Muslims of Granada	Victory: Rebellion defeated; Mass forced conversions of all Muslims in Granada
Second Ottoman–Venetian War (1499–1503): Siege of the Castle of Saint George; Location: Adriatic, Ionian and Aegean Seas	Republic of Venice; Castile and Aragon	Ottoman Empire	Defeat: Venetian strongholds of Modon and Coron fall to the Ottomans; Cephalonia and Ithaca to Venice
Second Italian War (1499–1501) Location: Italian Peninsula, Mediterranean Sea	Kingdom of France; Papal States; Republic of Venice; Castile and Aragon	Duchy of Milan; Kingdom of Naples	Victory, French victory over Duchy of Milan; French control of the Duchy of Milan; Spain and France reparts between them the Kingdom of Naples on Treaty of Granada (1500), deposing Frederick of Naples.
Kemal Reis' raids on Western Mediterranean and Atlantic Sea (1501): Ottoman raid on the Balearic Islands (1501); Location: Mediterranean Sea, Balearic Islands, Canary Islands	Castile and Aragon Republic of Genoa Venice	Ottoman Empire Supported by: Moriscos	Victory
Third Italian War (1502–1504): Battle of Ruvo; Battle of Seminara; Battle of Cerignola; Battle of Garigliano; Campaign of Rosellon; Location: Italian Peninsula	Castile and Aragon	Kingdom of France	Victory: Peace of Lyon and Treaty of Blois (1504); Louis XII of France ceded Naples to Ferdinand II of Aragon; Division of Northern and Southern Italy between France and Spain
Guelders Wars (1502–1543): Revolt of Ghent (1539–1540); Location: Low Countries, Frisia	Habsburg: Habsburg Monarchy: Habsburg Netherlands; Spain County of Holland County of Flanders Duchy of Brabant Duchy of Luxemburg Imperial Frisia (Saxony) (1514–15) Bishopric of Utrecht (1508–28)	Guelders: Duchy of Guelders Groningen & Ommelanden (1514–36) Frisian rebels (1514–23) Jülich-Cleves-Berg (1538–43) Supported by: Kingdom of France County of East Frisia (1514–17) Utrecht rebel groups (1520–28)	Habsburg victory: Guelders, Utrecht, Frisia and Groningen annexed; Overijssel and Drenthe detached from Utrecht; Jülich and East Frisia remain independent
Spanish crusade (1503–12): Capture of Mers-el-Kébir; Battle of Mers-el-Kébir; Conquest of the Peñón de Vélez de la Gomera; Spanish conquest of Oran; Spanish conquest of Tripoli; Spanish assault on Djerba; Capture of Béjaïa; Part of Spanish campaigns in the Maghreb (1497–1535) and Zayyanid–Iberian conflicts; Location: North Africa (modern Maghreb countries), Mediterranean Sea	Crown of Castile; Crown of Aragon	Kingdom of Tlemcen; Hafsid dynasty: Hafsids of Béjaïa; Wattasid dynasty	Victory: Start of Spanish-Ottoman Wars of 1515–1577 for the control of Algeria, Tunisia and Mediterranean Sea.
Rebellion of Cordoba (1506–08) Location: Córdoba, Spain	Crown of Castile; Crown of Aragon	Cordobese rebels	Royalist victory
War of the League of Cambrai (1508–1516): Battle of Ravenna; Battle of La Motta; part of Transalpine campaigns of the Old Swiss Confederacy; Location: Western Europe (Italian Peninsula, Iberian Peninsula, Modern France and England)	1508–10: Venice; 1510–11: Papal States; Venice; 1511–13: Holy League: Papal States; Venice; Spain; Holy Roman Empire; England (Old Swiss Confederacy) Swiss mercenaries 1513–16: Papal States; Spain; Holy Roman Empire; England; Duchy of Milan (Old Swiss Confederacy) Swiss mercenaries	1508–10: League of Cambrai: Papal States; France; Holy Roman Empire; Spain; Duchy of Ferrara; 1510–11: France; Duchy of Ferrara; 1511–13: France; Duchy of Ferrara Scotland Florence 1513–16: Venice; France; Duchy of Ferrara	Defeat
Spanish conquest of Puerto Rico (1508–1511) Location: Americas, Caribbean Sea, Puerto Rico	Crown of Castile	Taínos	Victory
Sack of Niebla (1508) Location: Iberian Peninsula	Castile and Aragon	Duke of Medina Sidonia	Victory
Spanish conquest of Iberian Navarre (1512–1529) Location: Iberian Peninsula	Castile and Aragon	Kingdom of Navarre; France	Victory: Navarre south of the Pyrenees annexed to Crown of Castile under the Spanish Monarchy.; A small portion of Navarre north of the Pyrenees, Lower Navarre, along with the neighbouring Principality of Béarn survived as an independent kingdom, which passed by inheritance to French monarchs.
Spanish conquest of Cuba (1511–1513) Location: Americas, Caribbean Sea, Cuba	Crown of Castile	Taínos	Victory
Taíno rebellion of 1511 (1511–1518) Location: Americas, Caribbean Sea, Puerto Rico	Crown of Castile	Taínos of Boriken and allies from the Antilles	Victory: Tainos are exiled and still fighting outside until 1529.
Spanish conquest of the Maya (1511–1697) Location: Mesoamerica and Central America	Spain	Late Postclassic Maya states	Victory
Spanish conquest of Iberian Navarre (1511–1529): Sangüesa insurrection; Location: Pyrenees	Spain	Kingdom of Navarre Supported by: France	Castilian-Aragonese victory: Navarre south of the Pyrenees is annexed to Spain, while north of the Pyrenees to France.

== Habsburg Spain ==
Conflict	Combatant 1	Combatant 2	Results
Spanish-Ottoman Wars of 1515–1577: Algiers expedition (1516); Algiers expedition (1519); Capture of Peñón of Algiers; Battle of Formentera; Siege of Coron (1533–1534); Conquest of Tunis (1534); Conquest of Tunis (1535); Sack of Mahón; Siege of Castelnuovo; Battle of Preveza; Battle of Girolata; Algiers expedition; Siege of Nice; Battle of Alborán; Sack of Cullera; Siege of Tripoli (1551); Capture of Béjaïa (1555); Siege of Oran (1556); Raid of the Balearic islands (1558); Expedition to Mostaganem (1558); Battle of Djerba; Sieges of Oran and Mers El Kébir; Great Siege of Malta; Capture of Tunis (1569); Battle of Lepanto; Conquest of Tunis (1574); Location: Mediterranean Sea, Southern Europe, North Africa	Spanish Empire: Kingdom of Naples; Kingdom of Sicily; Supported by: Holy Roman Empire: Duchy of Burgundy; Duchy of Savoy; (Sovereign Military Order of Malta) Malta; Republic of Genoa; Monaco; Papal States; Republic of Florence; Hafsid Kingdom	Ottoman Empire: Ottoman Egypt; Ottoman Libya; Ottoman Tunisia; Ottoman Algeria; Supported by: France	Ottoman victory in North Africa, strategic balance in the Mediterranean
Spanish-Algerian war (1516–1518): Capture of Algiers; Algiers expedition; Battle of Oued Djer; Expedition to the Moulouya; Siege of Tlemcen; Part of Spanish campaigns in the Maghreb (1497–1535) and Spanish–Ottoman Wars of 1515–1577; Location: North Africa	Spain: (Spain) Spanish Oran; Kingdom of Tlemcen	Regency of Algiers Kingdom of Kuku	Hispano-Zayyanid Victory: Khayr al-Din renounced the title of Sultan of Algiers. Then contacted Selim I, offering his allegiance as Beylerbey and obtained Ottoman assistance for the next year.
Portuguese invasion of Couto Misto (1517–1518): Part of Portuguese-Galician border conflicts; Location: Portugal–Spain border	Kingdom of Spain; Kingdom of Galicia; Couto Misto	Kingdom of Portugal	Defeat: The village of Pena, situated between Santiago de Rubiás and Vilar, was burned by a Portuguese raiding force
Spanish-Ottoman War (1518–1519): Fall of Tlemcen; Algiers expedition; Spanish assault on Djerba; Part of Spanish campaigns in the Maghreb (1497–1535) and Spanish-Ottoman Wars of 1515–1577; Location: North Africa	Spain: (Spain) Spanish Oran; Kingdom of Sicily Kingdom of Kuku	Ottoman Empire: Regency of Algiers	Stalemate: Hayreddin Barbarossa recaptured Tlemcen in December 1518 and is made Beylerbey in 1521.; King of Kuku annexes Algiers and reigns there for several years.
Spanish conquest of the Aztec Empire (1519–21): The Night of Sorrows; Fall of Tenochtitlan; Location: Mesoamerica (Modern Mexico)	(Spain) Spanish conquistadores Indian auxiliaries: Tlaxcala; Cempoala	Aztec Empire	Victory: Aztec empire is annexed to Spanish Empire
Revolt of the Brotherhoods (1519–23): Brotherhoods of Mallorca; Location: Iberian Peninsula	Empire of Charles V: Kingdom of Valencia; Kingdom of Majorca	Germanies	Royalist victory
Revolt of the Comuneros (1520–21): Battle of Villalar; Location: Iberian Peninsula (Crown of Castile)	Empire of Charles V	Castilian rebels	Royalist victory
Gipuzkoa revolt of 1520–21 Location: Iberian Peninsula (Basque Country)	Empire of Charles V	Basque rebels	Royalist victory
Indigenous Rebellion of 1520: part of conquest of Venezuela; Location: South America	(Spain) Spanish conquistadores	caribes, tagares and aruacas	Defeat: Spaniards retreat and punish Antonio Flores for killing an indigenous Cacique.
Italian War of 1521–1526 (1521–1526): Battle of Pampluna; Battle of Noain-Esquiroz; Battle of Noáin; Battle of Bicocca; Siege of Genoa; Battle of Sesia; Italian campaign of 1524–1525; Battle of Pavia; Location: Western Europe (Italian Peninsula, Iberian Peninsula, Modern France and Low Countries)	Spain; Holy Roman Empire; England; Papal States (1521–1523 and 1525–1526)	France: (Old Swiss Confederacy) Swiss mercenaries; Republic of Venice Papal States (1524–1525) Marquisate of Saluzzo	Habsburg Victory: Capture of Francois I of France
Green Banner Mutiny (1521) Location: Iberian Peninsula, Seville	Spain: Kingdom of Seville	Andalusian rebels	Government victory
Battle of Mactan (1521): Part of Magellan expedition; Location: Asia, Philippine Islands	(Spain) Spain; Rajahnate of Cebu	Kedatuan of Mactan	Defeat: Visayan kingdom of Mactan Island forces kills Magellan.
1521 Santo Domingo Slave Revolt (1521) Location: Americas, Caribbean Sea, Hispaniola	Spain	African slaves	Victory
Moluccas issue (1521–1529): Magellan expedition; Loaísa expedition; Saavedra expedition; Location: Asia, Maluku Islands (modern Indonesia)	Spain: (Spain) Spanish East Indies	(Portugal) Portuguese Empire: (Portugal) Portuguese Malacca	Stalemate: Treaty of Zaragoza
Tidore-Ternate conflicts (1521–1667): Spanish Jailolo-Portuguese Ternate war of 1533; Spanish conquest of the Moluccas; Location: Asia, Maluku Islands and Philippine Islands	Sultanate of TidoreSupported by: Spain: (Spain) Spanish East Indies; Ternatean supporters of Spanish rule (since 1606); Jailolo Sultanate (until 1536) Sultanate of Bacan (1521–1557; 1583–1609)	Sultanate of Ternate: Jailolo Sultanate (since 1551); Supported by: (Portugal) Portuguese Empire (until 1605): (Portugal) Portuguese India; (Portugal) Portuguese Malacca; (Portugal) Portuguese Macau; (Portugal) Portuguese Indonesian colonies; (Dutch Republic) Dutch Empire (since 1605): Dutch East Indies; Sultanate of Bacan (1557–1583; 1609–1667)	Stalemate
Spanish conquest of the Tarascan empire (1522–1530) Location: Mesoamerica (ModernMexico)	Spain: New Spain; Indian auxiliaries	Purépecha Empire	Victory: Incorporation of the territory into the Viceroyalty of New Spain
Spanish conquest of Chiapas (1523–1695) Location: Mesoamerica (ModernMexico)	Spain: New Spain; Indian auxiliaries	Zoque people Chiapaneca people Independent Maya, including: Lakandon Chʼol people; Tojolabal people; Tzotzil people	
Spanish conquest of Yucatán (1523–1547) Location: Mesoamerica (ModernMexico)	Spain: New Spain; Indian auxiliaries	Mayan tribes	Victory
Spanish conquest of Guatemala (1524–1667): Spanish conquest of the Kingdom of Q'umarkaj; Location: Central America	Spain: New Spain; Indian auxiliaries	Independent indigenous kingdoms and city-states	Victory
Spanish conquest of El Salvador (1524–1539) Location: Central America	Spain: New Spain; Indian auxiliaries	Indigenous peoples of El Salvador, including: Chʼortiʼ Maya people; Lenca people; Mangue people; Matagalpa people; Pipil people; Poqomam Maya people; Xinca people	Victory
Spanish conquest of Honduras (1524 – c. 1539) Location: Central America	Spain: New Spain	Indigenous peoples of Honduras, including: Chorotega people; Ch'ol Maya people; Ch'orti' Maya people; Jicaque people; Lenca people; Pech people; Pipil people; Sumu people	Victory
Spanish Expedition to Chesapeake Bay (1526) Location: North America (modern South Carolina)	Spain: New Spain	Hostile Natives African rebels Spanish mutineers	Defeat: San Miguel de Gualdape is abandoned.
War of the League of Cognac (1526–1530): Sack of Rome; Battle of Capo d'Orso; Battle of Landriano; Siege of Florence; Location: Italian Peninsula	Spain; Holy Roman Empire; Republic of Genoa (1528–1530) Duchy of Ferrara Duchy of Mantua (1528–1530)	France: (Old Swiss Confederacy) Swiss mercenaries; Papal States: (Papal States) Swiss Guards; Republic of Venice; Republic of Florence; Kingdom of England Republic of Genoa (1526–1528) Kingdom of Navarre; Duchy of Milan	Victory
Ottoman–Habsburg wars (1526–1791): Spanish-Ottoman Wars of 1515–1577; Capture of Peñón of Algiers; Siege of Vienna; Hungarian campaign of 1527–1528; Balkan campaign of 1529; Battle of Formentera; Little War in Hungary; Siege of Coron; Conquest of Tunis (1535); Sack of Mahón; Siege of Castelnuovo; Battle of Girolata; Battle of Alboran; Algiers expedition; Capture of Mahdia; Siege of Oran; Ottoman raid of the Balearic islands; Expedition to Mostaganem; Battle of Djerba; Sieges of Oran and Mers El Kébir; Great Siege of Malta; Battle of Lepanto; Conquest of Tunis (1574); Long Turkish War; Battle of Cape Corvo; Battle of Cape Celidonia; Great Turkish War; Location: Eastern Europe, Central Europe, Southern Europe, North Africa, Mediterranean Sea, Indian Ocean, Southeast Asia	Habsburg dynasty: Holy Roman Empire: Archduchy of Austria; Kingdom of Bohemia; Republic of Genoa; Kingdom of Hungary: Kingdom of Croatia; Spanish Empire; Non-Habsburg allies: Moldavia; Transylvania; Wallachia; Tsardom of Russia; Cossack Hetmanate (Muscovite and Polish vassals); Holy League Allies: Polish–Lithuanian Commonwealth; Duchy of Mantua; Republic of Venice (Sovereign Military Order of Malta) Order of Saint John	Ottoman Empire; Vassals: Moldavia; Transylvania; Wallachia; Cossack Hetmanate (Doroshenko's faction); Crimean Khanate	Victory End of Ottoman expansion: Decline of both the Ottoman and Habsburg empires
Hungarian Civil War (1526–1538): Part of Habsburg–Ottoman wars in Hungary and Austro-Turkish War (1529–1533); Location: Eastern Europe and Central Europe (Modern Hungary, Croatia, Romania and Austria)	(Kingdom of Hungary) Western Hungarian Kingdom: Hungarian loyals to Ferdinand I; Kingdom of Croatia; Supported by: Holy Roman Empire Empire of Charles V: Spain; Archduchy of Austria; Papal States Serbian rebels	Eastern Hungarian Kingdom: Hungarian and Croats loyals to John I; Voivode of Transylvania; Supported by: Ottoman Empire: Serbian Despotate; Wallachia; Moldavia; Ottoman Hungary; Kingdom of France	Stalemate: Hungary was divided into larger Ottoman and smaller Habsburg spheres of influence, as well as a semi-independent Hungarian vassal state of Transylvania.; Treaty of Nagyvárad divided Hungary between them. Ferdinand recognized Zápolya as John I, King of Hungary and ruler of two-thirds of the Kingdom, while Zápolya conceded the rule of Ferdinand over western Hungary, and recognized him as heir to the Hungarian throne, since Zápolya was childless.
Espadán Rebellion (1526): part of Mudejar revolts; Location: Iberian Peninsula	Spain: Kingdom of Valencia	Morisco	Crown victory
Narváez expedition (1528–36) Location: North America (modern Southern United States)	Spain: New Spain	Tocobaga Uzita; Apalachee; Timucua; Autes	Inconclusive: Spanish troops lost the route after a hurricane and return by land to Mexico.
First Austro-Turkish War (1529–1533): 1st Ottoman siege of Vienna; Location: Central Europe (Modern Austria and Southern Germany)	Empire of Charles V: Spain; Archduchy of Austria; Holy Roman Empire: Electorate of the Palatinate; Kingdom of Bohemia; Papal States	Ottoman Empire: Moldavia; Ottoman Hungary; Eastern Hungarian Kingdom	Stalemate: Truce of Constantinople (1533). There would be no real peace treaty in the entire sixteenth century. Habsburg-Ottoman sporadic battles continue.
Spanish-Ottoman War (1529–1541): Capture of Peñón of Algiers (1529); Campaign of Cherchell (1531); Siege of Coron; Conquest of Tunis (1534); Conquest of Tunis (1535); Spanish expedition to Tlemcen (1535); Sack of Mahón; Pulya Campaign; Battle of Preveza; Siege of Castelnuovo; Invasion of Gibraltar (1540); Battle of Girolata; Algiers expedition (1541); Part of Spanish–Ottoman Wars of 1515–1577; Location: Mediterranean Sea and North Africa	Empire of Charles V: Spain; Kingdom of Sicily; Kingdom of Naples; Kingdom of Sardinia; Holy Roman Empire; Republic of Genoa; County of Flanders; Papal States Kingdom of Portugal Knights of Malta Kingdom of France (until 1534) Hafsid dynasty Kingdom of Kuku	Ottoman Empire: Regency of Algiers; (Ottoman Empire) Ottoman Tunisia; Kingdom of Tlemcen Banu Rashid Arab irregulars Kingdom of France (since 1535)	Stalemate: Mostly victories for Ottoman raids, by Hayreddin Barbarossa on Mediterranean sea.; Spaniards could not install a client Zayyanid prince on the throne in Tlemcen. Algiers is under fully Ottoman control; After Habsburg forces conquer the fortress of Monastir, Sousse, Hammamet and Kelibia, Spaniards make Tunisia, under Muley Hassan of the Hafsid dynasty, a Client state.
Ternatean–Portuguese conflicts (1530–1605): Revolt of Dayal (1533–1536); Jailolo war; Spanish expedition to the Moluccas of 1602–1603; Dutch conquest of Tidore; Location: Asia, Maluku Islands and Philippine Islands	(Portugal) Portuguese Empire: Portuguese East Indies; Ternateans loyals to Portuguese protectorate; Spain (since 1580): (Spain) Spanish East Indies; Sultanate of Tidore; Sultanate of Bacan	Sultanate of Ternate: Sultanate of Jailolo; Spain (from 1533 to 1536): (Spain) Spanish East Indies; Sultanate of Tidore; (Dutch Republic) Dutch Empire (since 1605): Dutch East India Company	Defeat: The Portuguese settlers with their families were forced to leave Tidore for Manila.; Establishment of Dutch-Ternate alliance against Iberian alliance.; Response with the Spanish conquest of the Moluccas.
Spanish conquest of the Inca Empire (1531–72): Battle of Punta Quemada; Battle of Puná; Battle of Cajamarca; Battle of Vilcaconga; Battle of Cuzco; Battle of Maraycalla; Battle of Mount Chimborazo; Siege of Cuzco; Siege of Lima; Battle of Ollantaytambo; Battle of Abancay; Battle of Las Salinas; Battle of Chupas; Battle of Iñaquito; Battle of Huarina; Battle of Jaquijahuana; Location: South America (Modern Peru, Bolivia, Ecuador, southern Colombia, northern Chile and northwest Argentina)	(Spain) Spanish conquistadores: (Spain) Province of Tierra Firme (until 1537); (Spain) Governorate of New Castile (until 1542); (Spain) Governorate of New Toledo (until 1542); (Spain) Viceroyalty of Peru (since 1542); Indian auxiliaries: Cañaris; Huancas; Huaylas; Chachapoya; Tlaxcalans; Nicaraguas; Collaborist Inca nobility; Huáscarist; Neo-Inca State (until 1536); Catholized Incas	Inca Empire (until 1535): Atahualpist; Neo-Inca State (since 1536): Pagan resistance	Victory: Former Inca lands, after death of Atahualpa, are incorporated into Viceroyalty of Peru.; Start of Civil wars between the conquerors of Peru; Vilcabamba Inca firms Treaty of Acobamba, thus making a Translatio imperii of the Mascapaicha rights, to rule the "Reynos del Perú" [Tahuantinsuyo], from Vilcabamba Incas to the Spanish Kings as heirs of Atahualpa rights.; Exploration and conquest of the various dominions and towns of South America by Spain from the Kingdom of Peru.
Yaqui Wars (1533–1929): Part of Mexican Indian Wars; Location: North America	Spanish Empire (until 1821): New Spain; Mexico (since 1821) United States (since 1896)	Yaqui	Stalemate Mexican-American victory
Dutch-Hanseatic Corsair War (1532–1534): Part of Sont Wars; Location: Baltic Sea and North Sea	Empire of Charles V: Habsburg Netherlands; Holstein England (until 1533) Supported by: Denmark-Norway [Catholics]	Hanseatic League: Free City of Lübeck; England (since 1533) Supported by: Sweden Denmark-Norway [Protestants]	Militarily inconclusive Political victory: Marx Meier sacks the Spanish fleets on the Baltic and English coasts while Protestant Reformation still ongoing in Nordic countries, but Hanseatic League start to decline in Northern Europe (in favour of Dutch, Danes and Swedes) and it is isolated of support from the German enemies of Charles V.; The Council of Lübeck, beside the attitude of Jürgen Wullenwever (mayor of Lübeck) accept a ceasefire offer in March 1534, and also changed sides in the Denmark Succession Conflict and joins to the Count's Feud in favour of Cristian II (so, the conflict ended de facto as both were in the same side in the new Conflict, but legally would continue 4 years more). Also Peace of Stockeldorf with Holstein; Dutch and Spanish ships can cross the Øresund Strait and commerce in Eastern Baltic Sea, declining the Hanseatic Monopoly.; End of the economical supremacy of Lubeck over the Hanseatic League, and also fall of Jürgen Wullenwever.
Count's Feud (1534–1536): Battle of Heiligerlee (1536); Part of European wars of religion; Location: Northern Europe (Denmark)	Christian II (Catholics) County of Oldenburg Free City of Lübeck Scania Malmö Copenhagen Zealand Supported by: Norwegian nobles Empire of Charles V: Habsburg Netherlands	Christian III (Protestants) Schleswig Holstein Sweden Duchy of Prussia Jutland Funen Supported by: Norwegian nobles Duchy of Guelders	Defeat: Consolidation of Reformation in Denmark–Norway and Holstein and Absolutist monarchy.; Invasion of Catholic Norway by Protestant Denmark, making Denmark–Norway union.
Iguape War (1534–1536) Location: Southern Brazil	(Spain) Spanish Empire Indian auxiliaries: Carijós; Guaianás	(Portugal) Portuguese Empire: Brazilian colonial forces	Defeat: Spaniards retreat from the region of São Vicente, São Paulo
Expedition of Francisco Vázquez de Coronado (1535–1554) Location: North America	ESP: New Spain; Indian auxiliaries	Pueblo Zuni people	Stalemate: Spanish withdrawal after finding Cíbola and Quivira, being desilusionated due to not being the Seven Cities of Gold.
Sicily Mutiny (1535); Location: Sicily	ESP: (Spain) Viceroyalty of Sicily	(Spain) Tercio of Sicily mutineers	Rebellion repressed
First attempt of colonizing Buenos Aires (1536–1541) Location: Río de la Plata Basin (Modern Argentina)	Spanish Empire: (Spanish Empire) Port of Santa Maria del Buen Aire	Querandí Help from: Charrúa Guaraní Chana Timbú	Defeat: Indigenous peoples burned down the city in 1539.; The Spanish abandon the city and translate to Asunción in 1541.
Italian War of 1536–1538 (1536–1538) Location: Southern France, Northern Italy and Mediterranean Sea	Holy Roman Empire; Spain: (Old Swiss Confederacy) Swiss mercenaries	Kingdom of France; Ottoman Empire	Defeat: Truce of Nice; Savoy and Piedmont acquired by France
Civil wars between the conquerors of Peru (1537–1554): Great Encomenderos Rebellion; Location: South America (Modern Peru, Bolivia, Ecuador and Chile)	(Spain) Royalists: (Spain) Viceroyalty of Peru	Pizarrists (New Castile) Almagrists (New Toledo) Gonzalists: Encomendero	Royalist Victory: Governorate of New Castile and Governorate of New Toledo are replaced by Viceroyalty of Peru.; Effective establishment of royal authority, to the detriment of the power acquired by the Encomenderos.; Effective promulgation of the New Laws to protect natural rights of the Indigenous peoples of the Americas. Consolidation of Derecho indiano.
Spanish conquest of the Muisca (1537–1540): Part of Spanish conquest of New Granada; Location: South America (Modern Colombia)	Spain: (Spain) Province of Tierra Firme; (Holy Roman Empire) (Spain) Klein-Venedig; (Spain) Governorate of New Castile; Indian auxiliaries: Zipazgos of the south	Muisca Confederation Guecha warriors	Victory: Muisca Confederation becomes part of the Spanish Empire; Foundation of the New Kingdom of Granada after vassal the indigenous peoples of the territory.
Spanish conquest of Chaco region (1537–1800s) Location: South America, Gran Chaco	Spain: (Spain) Governorate of New Andalusia (until 1542); (Spain) Viceroyalty of Peru (since 1542); (Spain) Governorate of Paraguay; (Spain) Governorate of Rio de la Plata; (Spain) Viceroyalty of Rio de la Plata (since 1776); Jesuit missions Indian auxiliaries: Guaraní people; Christianized Guaycuru peoples (Portugal) Portuguese Empire; Brazilian colonial forces	Gran Chaco people (Guaycuru peoples): Abipón; Payaguá; Calchaquí; Mocoví	Inconclusive due to economical problems after the Expulsion of the Jesuits and the Spanish American wars of independence.
Third Ottoman–Venetian War (1537–40): Part of Spanish-Ottoman Wars of 1515–1577 and Italian War of 1536–1538; Location: Mediterranean Sea	Holy League: Republic of Venice; Spain; Republic of Genoa; Papal States; Kingdom of Naples; Kingdom of Sicily (Sovereign Military Order of Malta) Knights of Malta	Ottoman Empire; France (until 1538)	Defeat
Spanish expedition to North America (1539–1543): Battle of Mabila; Mississippi River battle; Location: North America (modern Georgia and South Carolina)	Spain: New Spain; Indian auxiliaries (Portugal) Portuguese volunteers	Chickasaw; Cofitachequi; Coosa chiefdom Joara; Northern Utina; Ocute; Tuskaloosa chiefdom	Defeat and withdrawal of Hernando de Soto.
Grijalva expedition to the equatorial Pacific (1539–42) Location: Pacific Ocean	Spain: New Spain; (Spain) Governorate of New Castile	Hostile Indigenous peoples Spanish mutineers	Inconsclusive due to the loss of the ship in New Guinea.
Revolt of Ghent (1539–1540) Location: Low Countries and Germany	Empire of Charles V	Citizens of Ghent	Victory: Building of the Castle of the Spaniards (Spanjaardenkasteel)
Mixtón War (1540–42): part of Mexican indian war; Location: North America	Spain: New Spain	Caxcanes	Victory
Tiguex War (1540–41): Part of Mexican indian war; Location: North America	Spain: New Spain	Tiwa Indians	Victory
Second Austro-Turkish War (1540–1547): Part of Habsburg–Ottoman wars in Hungary (1526–1568) and Croatian–Ottoman wars; Location: Central Europe and Eastern Europe	Habsburg monarchy: Archduchy of Austria; Kingdom of Hungary; Kingdom of Croatia; Holy Roman Empire: Bohemia; Duchy of Styria; Duchy of Carniola; Spain: (Spain) Spanish Italy; Papal States	Ottoman Empire: Crimean Khanate; Wallachia; Moldavia; Ottoman Hungary; Eastern Hungarian Kingdom France	Defeat: Truce of Adrianople (1547); Ferdinand I of Austria and Charles I of Spain recognized total Ottoman control of Hungary.
Conquest of Chile (1541–1598): Part of Spanish conquest of the Inca Empire (theatre of Qullasuyu); Location: South America (modern Chile)	(Spain) Spanish Empire: (Spain) Governorate of New Toledo (until 1542); (Spain) Viceroyalty of Peru (since 1542); (Spain) Captaincy General of Chile; Indian auxiliaries	Indigenous peoples in Chile	Establishment of the Captaincy General of Chile after incorporating the territories up to the Biobío River, avoiding incorporating hostile indigenous people. Beginning of the Arauco War.
Nachi Cocom's Rebellion (1542) Location: Mexico	Spain: New Spain	Cocom	Victory: Nachi Cocom is vassalized as a Cacique subject to Spanish Monarchy.
Italian War of 1542–1546 (1542–1546): Siege of Perpignan; Siege of Nice; Battle of Muros; Block of Genoa; Battle of Ceresole; Battle of Serravalle; Part of Spanish-Ottoman Wars of 1515–1577; Location: Western Europe (Italian Peninsula, Iberian Peninsula, Low Countries, England, France)	Spain Holy Roman Empire: Saxony; Brandenburg; Kingdom of England	France: (Old Swiss Confederacy) Swiss mercenaries; Ottoman Empire; Jülich-Cleves-Berg Denmark–Norway (1542–1543)	Inconclusive: Treaty of Crépy and Treaty of Ardres
Spanish expedition to Tidore and Papuan Islands of Ruy López de Villalobos (1542–1543) Location: Pacific Ocean (Modern Indonesia and Papua New Guinea)	Spain: (Spain) Spanish East Indies; Sultanate of Tidore	Pirates' nest Gebe on Papuan Islands	Pyrrhic Victory
Spanish expedition to Tlemcen (1543) Location: North Africa (Algeria)	(Spain) Spanish Empire; Supporters of Abu Abdallah VI	Kingdom of Tlemcen; Banu Rashid; Wattasid sultanate Minor support: Regency of Algiers	Victory: Abu Abdallah VI restored to the Zayyanid throne as a Spanish vassal
Expedition to Mostaganem (1543) Location: North Africa (Algeria)	Spanish Empire	Regency of Algiers	Defeat
1st Communero Rebellion of Paraguay (1544) Location: South America (Paraguay, North Argentina and Eastern Bolivia)	(Spain) Spanish Empire: (Spain) Viceroyalty of Peru; (Spain) Governorate of Rio de la Plata and Paraguay	Communero rebels	Defeat: Establishment of Domingo Martínez de Irala as governor by popular election of the Encomenderos.
Attack on Jailolo (1545) Location: Maluku Islands	(Portugal) Portuguese Empire: (Portugal) Portuguese Indonesia; (Spain) Spanish Empire: (Spain) Spanish East Indies; Sultanate of Ternate	Sultanate of Jailolo	Defeat
Arauco War (1546–17th or 18th century): Battle of Quilacura; Battle of Andalien; Battle of Penco; Battle of Tucapel; Battle of Marihueñu; Battle of Peteroa; Battle of Mataquito; Battle of Lagunillas; Battle of Millarapue; Battle of Quiapo; Siege of Concepción; Battle of Angol; Battle of Catirai; Battle of Curalaba; Destruction of the Seven Cities; Location: South America (Modern Chile and Argentina)	(Spain) Spanish Empire: (Spain) Viceroyalty of Peru; (Spain) Captaincy General of Chile; (Spain) Viceroyalty of Rio de la Plata (since 1777); Indian auxiliaries: Yanaconas; Indios reyunos; Mapuche allies (Boroano, etc.); Other Cacicazgos	Indigenous people from Araucania and Patagonia: Mapuche; Huilliche; Cuncos; Pehuenche; Other tribes	Defeat: Spanish Empire renounces the domination of the territories south of the Biobío River and recognizes the independence of the Mapuche tribes of the place.; «La Frontera» appears, as a border area between the Captaincy General of Chile and the territory of the Mapuche tribes.; Successive peace parliaments between the Spanish Empire and the Mapuche tribes during the conflict.
Schmalkaldic War (1546–47): part of European wars of religion; Location: Central Europe (Holy Roman Empire, Modern Germany)	Empire of Charles V: Spain; Holy Roman Empire; Duchy of Saxony (Albertines); Kingdom of Hungary; Kingdom of Bohemia and other Lands of the Bohemian Crown Papal States	Schmalkaldic League: Electorate of Saxony (Ernestines); Hesse; Electorate of the Palatinate; Bremen; Lübeck; Brunswick-Lüneburg; Other German territories; Kingdom of England	Victory: Capitulation of Wittenberg: Schmalkaldic League dissolved, Saxon electoral dignity passed to the Albertine House of Wettin
The Estates Revolt in Bohemia (1547) Location: Central Europe (Holy Roman Empire, Modern Czech Republic)	Empire of Charles V: Spain; Holy Roman Empire	(Bohemia) Bohemian rebels Electorate of Saxony	Victory
Bayano Wars (1548–82) Location: South America (Modern Colombia)	Spain: (Spain) Peru; (Spain) New Kingdom of Granada	Slaves	Victory
Chichimeca War (1550–90): Part of Mexican indian war; Location: North America (Modern Mexico)	Spain: New Spain; Indian auxiliaries (Tlaxcalteca, Caxcan, Otomí, Mexica, Purépecha)	Chichimeca (Zacateco, Guachichil, Guamare, Pame)	Defeat
Spanish-Ottoman War (1550–1560): Capture of Mahdia; Siege of Tripoli; Campaign of Tlemcen (1551); Capture of Béjaïa; Raid of the Balearic islands; Expedition to Mostaganem; Battle of Djerba; Part of German-Ottoman war 1550–1562, Spanish-Ottoman Wars of 1515–1577 and Conflicts between the Regency of Algiers and Morocco; Location: Mediterranean Sea, North Africa and Central Europe (mostly Hungary)	Spain (Sovereign Military Order of Malta) Knights of Malta Saadi Sultanate	Ottoman Empire: Regency of Algiers; (Ottoman Empire) Regency of Tunis; Kingdom of Beni Abbas Kingdom of Kuku	Defeat: Béjaïa under Ottoman rule.; Ottomans capture Tripoli.; Mahdia was abandoned by Spain.; Ottomans temporarily occupy parts of the Balearics.; Ottoman supremacy on Mediterranean sea seizured until Battle of Lepanto.
Italian War of 1551–1559 (1551–1559): War of Parma; Siege of Mirandola; Battle of Marciano; War of Siena; Siege of Civitella; Battle of St. Quentin; Battle of Gravelines; Location: Western Europe (Italian Peninsula, Low Countries, France)	(Spain) Spanish Empire; Holy Roman Empire; Kingdom of England; Republic of Florence; Duchy of Savoy	Kingdom of France: (Old Swiss Confederacy) Swiss mercenaries; Republic of Siena; Ottoman Empire Papal States	Victory: Peace of Cateau-Cambrésis; Spain is confirmed as the dominant power in Italy; France renounces its claim in Italy but wins the Three Bishoprics (Metz, Toul and Verdun) in Lorraine and the Pale of Calais from England.
Second Schmalkaldic War (1552–55) Location: Central Europe (Holy Roman Empire, Modern Germany)	Empire of Charles V: Spain; Holy Roman Empire	Electorate of Saxony Hesse Duchy of Prussia Electorate of Brandenburg Principality of Bayreuth Kingdom of France	Defeat: Extension of the rights of German electors (Cujus regio, ejus religio); Treaty of Passau (1552); Peace of Augsburg (1555); Abdication of Charles V; The bishoprics of Metz, Toul and Verdun pass to France; Cancellation of the Spanish Succession idea
Third Austro-Turkish War (1552–1559): Battle of Szeged; Siege of Temeswar; Part of German-Ottoman war 1550–1562 and Habsburg–Ottoman wars in Hungary (1526–1568); Location: Central Europe and Eastern Europe (modern Hungary and Romania)	Holy Roman Empire: Bohemia; (Austria) Habsburg monarchy: Archduchy of Austria; Kingdom of Hungary; Eastern Hungarian Kingdom (until 1556) Spain: (Spain) Spanish Italy	Ottoman Empire: Crimean Khanate; Wallachia; Moldavia; Eastern Hungarian Kingdom (since 1556) Kingdom of France	Stalemate: Treaty of Constantinople (1562); Banat became part of the Ottoman Empire.
Rebellion of Buria (1555) Location: Venezuela	Spain: (Spain) Captaincy General of Venezuela	Slave rebels loyals to "Kingdom of Buría"	Victory: The self-proclaimed King, Miguel de Buría, is punished
Bandeirantes raids from Brazil to Spanish domains (1557–18th century) Location: South America (mostly Amazon rainforest)	Spain: (Spain) Viceroyalty of Peru; (Spain) Viceroyalty of New Granada (since 1717); (Spain) Viceroyalty of Rio de la Plata (since 1777)	Bandeirantes from Colonial Brazil	Stalemate: The Amazon is divided between Spain and Portugal with the Treaty of Madrid (1750), as both countries compromissed to stop and punish bandits expeditions from bandeirantes.
Spanish-Ottoman War (1559–1565): Battle of Djerba; Sieges of Oran and Mers El Kébir; Sack of Granada; Great Siege of Malta; Part of Spanish-Ottoman Wars of 1515–1577; Location: Mediterranean Sea, Iberian Peninsula, North Africa	Spain: (Spain) Spanish Italy; Kingdom of Sicily; (Sovereign Military Order of Malta) Knights of Malta Duchy of Savoy Republic of Genoa Grand Duchy of Tuscany Papal States	Ottoman Empire: Regency of Algiers; (Ottoman Empire) Regency of Tunis; Kingdom of Beni Abbas Kingdom of Kuku Kingdom of France	Victory: Dragut dies in action leading to conflict between remaining Ottoman generals; Myth of Ottoman Invincibility in Europe destroyed
Calchaquí Wars (1560–1667): Part of Spanish conquest of Argentina; Location: South America (modern Argentine Northwest)	(Spain) Spanish Empire: (Spain) Peru; (Spanish Empire) Tucuman Governorate; (Spain) Real Audiencia of Charcas	Diaguita Confederation	Victory: Conquest of Tucuman.
Lope de Aguirre Insurrection(1560–61) Location: South America (Orinoco-Amazon basin and Venezuelan Caribbean)	(Spain) Spanish Empire: (Spain) Viceroyalty of Peru; (Spain) Venezuela Province; Indian auxiliaries	Marañones mutineer army Encomenderos	Inconclusive, the self proclaimed "Prince of Peru, Tierra Firme and Chile", Lope de Aguirre, is killed by his own followers due to his brutality and madness.: Mutineer initial victory by sabotaging Pedro de Ursúa's Peruvian expedition to Marañón and Amazon River, harming Spanish claims over Atlantic Amazon coasts.; Royalist victory against secessionists and bandits by stopping their raids over Margarita Island and Barquisimeto, with most of them being condemned to death by Trial of residence.
French Wars of Religion (1562–98): First French War of Religion (1562–1563); Battle of Arques; Battle of Ivry; Siege of Paris; Siege of Rouen; Siege of Caudebec; Battle of Craon; Battle of Blaye; Siege of Morlaix; Siege of Fort Crozon; Location: France and Low Countries	Catholics: Catholic League; Spain; Portugal; Papal States; Duchy of Savoy; Kingdom of France (until 1588)	Protestants: Huguenots; England; Scotland; Navarre; Politiques: Kingdom of France (since 1588); Tuscany	Inconclusive: Uneasy truce.; The Edict of Nantes granted the Huguenots substantial rights in certain areas.; Paris and other defined territories were declared to be permanently Catholic.; Failure of France's enemies to weaken France or to gain territories.
Battle of Gibraltar (1563) Location: Gibraltar	Spain	England	Victory
Rebellion of the Guamares (1564–1568) Location: Mexico	Spanish Empire: New Spain	Guamare people	Victory: Spaniards built Presidios in the zone.
Spanish-Chiriguana War (1564–17th century) Location: South America (Eastern Bolivia)	(Spain) Spanish Empire: (Spain) Viceroyalty of Peru; (Spain) Governorate of Santa Cruz de la Sierra; (Spain) Governorate of Paraguay	Ava Guaraní people	Victory: Conquest of Eastern Bolivia for the Real Audiencia of Charcas.
Spanish assault on French Florida (1565) Location: North America, Florida	Spain	Kingdom of France: French Florida; Huguenots	Victory
Spanish conquest of the Philippines (1565–1575): Capture of Cebu; Conquest of Madja-as; Battle of Manila (1570); Battle of Bangkusay Channel; Siege of Cainta (August 1571); Battle of Manila (1574); Location: Southeast Asia, Philippine Islands	Spain: Allied Visayan forces; Indian auxiliaries from Mexico (mostly Tlaxcalans)	Rajahnate of Maynila; Macabebe; Tondo polity Rahjanate of Cebu	Victory: Establishment of the Captaincy General of the Philippines by Miguel López de Legazpi.; Start of Spanish–Moro conflict
Spanish–Moro conflict (1565–1900): Battle of Cebu (1569); Spanish-Moro Incident (1570); Limahong campaign (1574–1576); Battle of Manila (1574); Castilian War (1578); Jolo Jihad (1578–1580); Mindanao expedition (1596); Cotabato Revolt (1597); Raid of Visayas (1599–1600); Spanish-Moro Incident (1602); Jolo expedition (1602); Basilan Revolt (1614); Kudarat Revolt (1625); Battle of Jolo (1628); Sulu Revolt (1628); Jolo expedition (1630); Lanao Lamitan Revolt (1637); Spanish occupation of Jolo (1638–1646); Battle of Punta Flechas (1638); Sultan Bungsu Revolt (1638); Mindanao Revolt (1638); Lanao Revolt (1639); Sultan Salibansa Revolt (1639); Corralat Revolt (1649); Spanish-Moro Incident (1876); Location: Southeast Asia, Southern Philippine Islands and Borneo Island	Spanish Empire: (Spain) Captaincy General of the Philippines	Sultanate of Sulu; Sultanate of Maguindanao; Confederation of sultanates in Lanao Supported by: Sultanate of Ternate; Bruneian empire; Ottoman Empire; (Dutch Republic) Dutch East India Company	Stalemate: Failure to conquer the Moros, but seizure of Spanish East Indies.; Start of Sino-Spanish conflicts due to Spanish attacks on Chinese tributary states.
Philippine revolts against Spain (1567–1872): Dagami revolt (1567); Tagalog Revolt (1574); Pampanga Revolt (1585); Tondo Conspiracy (1587); Dingras Revolt (1589); Cagayan Revolt (1589); Magalat revolt (1596); Igorot revolt (1601); Sangley Rebellion (1603); Caquenga's Revolt (1607); Irraya or Gaddang Revolt (1621); Tamblot uprising (1621–1622); Bankaw revolt (1621–1622); Itneg Revolt (1625–1627); Second Chinese Insurrection (1639–1640); Ladia Revolt (1643); Sumuroy Revolt (1649–1650); Maniago Revolt (1660–1661); Malong Revolt (1660–1661); Almazan Revolt (January 1661); Chinese Revolt (1662); Panay Revolt (1663); Zambal Revolt (1681–1683); Dagohoy Rebellion (1744–1829); Agrarian Revolt (1745); Silang Revolt (1762–1763); Palaris Revolt (1762–1765); Basi Revolt (1807); Novales Revolt (1823); Palmero Conspiracy (1828); Pule Revolt (1840–1841); Cavite mutiny (1872); Location: Philippines	Spain: New Spain; (Spain) Filipino loyalists	Filipino rebel groups; Muslim resistance; British supporters; Bruneian and Ottoman supporters; (Japan) Japanese and Chinese supporters	Victory: Most revolts failed
Spanish expeditions to the Solomon Islands and Vanuatu (1567–1606): First Spanish expedition to Solomon; Location: Oceania (Mostly Polynesia)	(Spain) Spanish Empire: (Spain) Peru; (Spain) Philippines	Hostile inhabitants of Polynesia	Stalemate: Failed colonization attempts due to disease and belligerence of the inhabitants, as well as war crimes by explorers that discouraged the enterprise.
Battle of Maracapana (1567/68) Location: Caribbean islands	Spain Indian auxiliaries: Jirajaran	Kalinago	Victory: Dissolution of the Caribbean alliance and flight of the chief Guaicaipuro to Suruapo to be assassinated in 1569.
Battle of San Juan de Ulúa (1568) Location: Caribbean Sea, Puerto Rico	Spain: New Spain	England	Victory
Blockade of Cebu (1568): Part of Portuguese–Spanish colonial rivalry; Location: Philippines	Spain: (Spain) Filipino loyalists	(Portugal) Portuguese Empire	Victory
Eighty Years' War (1568–1648) Western Europe: Battle of Oosterweel; Battle of Dahlen; Battle of Heiligerlee; Battle of Jemmingen; Battle of Jodoigne; Capture of Brielle; Siege of Mons; Relief of Goes; Sack of Mechelen; Siege of Middelburg; Siege of Haarlem; Siege of Alkmaar; Capture of Geertruidenberg; Siege of Leiden; Battle of Delft; Capture of Valkenburg; Battle of Mookerheyde; Siege of Oudewater; Siege of Schoonhoven; Siege of Zierikzee; Sack of Antwerp; Battle of Gembloux; Battle of Rijmenam; Siege of Deventer; Battle of Borgerhout; Siege of Maastricht; Capture of Mechelen; Siege of Steenwijk; Battle of Kollum; Capture of Breda; Battle of Noordhorn; Siege of Niezijl; Siege of Lochem; Siege of Lier; Siege of Eindhoven; Battle of Steenbergen; Capture of Aalst; Fall of Antwerp; Siege of IJsseloord; Battle of Empel; Battle of Boksum; Siege of Grave; Siege of Venlo; Capture of Axel; Destruction of Neuss; Siege of Rheinberg; Battle of Zutphen; Siege of Sluis; Siege of Bergen op Zoom; Capture of Geertruidenberg; Capture of Breda; Siege of Zutphen; Siege of Deventer; Capture of Delfzijl; Siege of Knodsenburg; Siege of Hulst; Siege of Nijmegen; Siege of Rouen; Siege of Caudebec; Siege of Steenwijk; Siege of Coevorden; Siege of Geertruidenberg; Siege of Coevorden; Siege of Huy; Siege of Groenlo; Battle of the Lippe; Siege of Calais; Siege of Hulst; Battle of Turnhout; Siege of Rheinberg; Siege of Meurs; Siege of Groenlo; Siege of Bredevoort; Capture of Enschede; Capture of Ootmarsum; Siege of Oldenzaal; Siege of Lingen; Siege of Schenckenschans; Siege of Zaltbommel; Siege of Rees; Battle of Nieuwpoort; Siege of Rheinberg; Siege of Ostend; Siege of 's-Hertogenbosch; Siege of Grave; Mutiny of Hoogstraten; Siege of Sluis; Siege of Lingen; Siege of Groenlo; Siege of Aachen; Siege of Jülich; Siege of Bergen op Zoom; Battle of Fleurus; Siege of Breda; Siege of Groenlo; 2nd 's-Hertogenbosch; Battle of the Slaak; Capture of Maastricht; Siege of Leuven; Siege of Schenkenschans; Siege of Breda; Siege of Venlo; Battle of Kallo; Siege of Hulst; European Waters: Battle of Flushing; Battle of Borsele; Battle of Haarlemmermeer; Battle on the Zuiderzee; Battle of Reimerswaal; Battle of Lillo; Battle of Bayona Islands; Battle of the Gulf of Almería; Islands Voyage; Battle of the Narrow Seas; Battle of Sluis; Battle of Gibraltar (1607); Battle of Gibraltar (1621); Battle off Lizard Point; Action of 18 February 1639; Action of 18 September 1639; Battle of the Downs; Battle of Cape St. Vincent; Americas: Dutch expedition to Magellan Strait; Battle of Castro; Recapture of Bahia; Battle in the Bay of Matanzas; Capture of Saint Martin; Battle of San Juan; Battle of Abrolhos; Attack on Saint Martin; Action of 12–17 January 1640; Dutch expedition to Valdivia; East Indies: Battle of Playa Honda; First Battle of San Salvador; Second Battle of San Salvador; Battles of La Naval de Manila; Battle of Puerto de Cavite	Spanish Empire: (Spain) Spanish Netherlands; Dunkirkers; New Spain; Peru; Holy Roman Empire (Portugal) Portuguese Empire (since 1580): State of Brazil	United Provinces: Dutch East Indies; Dutch West Indies; England; Nassau; France	Defeat: Peace of Münster; Independence of the Dutch Republic; Spanish retention of the Southern Netherlands
Morisco Revolt (1568–1571): part of Mudejar revolts; Location: Iberian Peninsula	Spain: Kingdom of Granada	Morisco rebels With the support of: Regency of Algiers; Wattasid dynasty	Victory
Spanish-Ottoman War (1569–1580): Capture of Tunis (1569); Battle of Lepanto; Siege of Navarino (1572); Conquest of Tunis (1574); Part of Spanish-Ottoman Wars of 1515–1577; Location: Eastern Mediterranean Sea (Peloponnese) and North Africa	Spain: (Spain) Spanish Italy; Kingdom of Sicily; Kingdom of Naples; Kingdom of Sardinia; (Sovereign Military Order of Malta) Knights of Malta Duchy of Savoy Republic of Genoa Grand Duchy of Tuscany Republic of Venice Papal States Hafsid dynasty	Ottoman Empire: Egypt Eyalet; (Ottoman Empire) Regency of Tunis; Regency of Algiers: Kingdom of Beni Abbas; Kingdom of Kuku	Pyrrhic Victory: Halting of the Ottoman advance in Europe after the end of its naval superiority. But loss of Spanish conquests in North Africa.; Division of the Mediterranean sea into areas of influence: western for Spain (from Iberian Peninsula to Italy) and eastern for the Ottomans (From the Balkans to Anatolia, and North Africa).; End of the Spanish-Ottoman proxy conflict for the control of the Mediterranean Sea and Maghreb since 1515.
Fourth Ottoman–Venetian War (1570–1573): Battle of Lepanto (1571); Part of Spanish-Ottoman Wars of 1515–1577; Location: Ionian Islands and Aegean Sea	Holy League: Republic of Venice; Spain: Kingdom of Sicily; Kingdom of Naples; Papal States; Republic of Genoa; Grand Duchy of Tuscany; Duchy of Urbino; Duchy of Savoy (Sovereign Military Order of Malta) Knights of Malta	Ottoman Empire	Defeat: Cyprus under Ottoman rule; Spanish-Ottoman truce since 1581.
Anti-Ottoman revolts of 1565–1572: Albanian revolt of 1566–1571; Location: Balkans and Eastern Mediterranean	Greeks and Albanians Supported by: Holy League (since 1571)	Ottoman Empire: Ottoman Albania; Ottoman Greece	Defeat
Spanish conquest of Mesopotamia (1573–1583) Location: South America, Mesopotamia, Argentina	Spanish Empire: Peru; (Spanish Empire) Río de la Plata and Paraguay Governorate; Jesuit missions among the Guaraní; Indian auxiliaries	Charrúan Complex Querandí Guaraní	Victory: Death of Juan de Garay
Limahong raids on the South China Sea (1572–1575): Battle of Manila (1574); Location: Philippines, Luzon (Pangasinan)	Ming China Spanish Empire: New Spain; Spanish East Indies; Indian auxiliaries from Mexico and Philippines	Wokou (Chinese and Japanese pirates) Moro people revolters	Victory: Start of China–Spain relations. Fujian viceroys offer the Spaniards a colonial port in Xiamen in exchange of capturing Limahong, but was never fulfilled.; Development of Anti-Chinese sentiment in Spain and Philippines due to fear of future Chinese colonization or attempts to expel Spaniards.
Castilian War (1578): Part of Ottoman-Habsburg Wars on Southeast Asia and Spanish-Moro Wars; Location: Southeast Asia (Borneo, Mindanao, Sulu)	Spanish Empire: (Spain) Spanish Philippines; Indian auxiliaries from Mexico and Peru; Bruneians who defected to Spain	Bruneian Empire Sultanate of Sulu Maguindanao Supported by: Ottoman Empire: Turks, Egyptians, Swahilis, Somalis, Sindhis, Gujaratis, and Malabars forces; (Aceh Sultanate) Sultanate of Aceh	Status quo ante bellum: Bruneian military victory to seize its independence from Spanish Empire. Becoming a city-state until today.; Spanish tactical Victory in ending Bruneian empire at sea and its influence on Philippines.
Battle of Alcácer Quibir (1578): Part of Moroccan–Portuguese conflicts; Location: North Africa	Portuguese Empire Saadi allies Supported by: Spanish Empire; Holy Roman Empire; Papal States	Saadi Morocco Supported by: Ottoman Empire	Defeat: Abu Abdallah Mohammed II Saadi is still depossed by Abu Marwan Abd al-Malik I Saadi; King of Portugal Sebastian I dies and, starting War of the Portuguese Succession. End of the Aviz dynasty
Expeditions to Chile hostile to Spain during the colony (1578–18th century) Location: Chile	(Spain) Spanish Empire: (Spain) Captaincy General of Chile	European Pirates and Corsairs (mostly English, Dutch and French)	Stalemate Mostly repelled
Second Desmond Rebellion (1579–1583): Siege of Carrigafoyle Castle; Siege of Smerwick; Part of Desmond Rebellions; Location: British Isles (Ireland)	FitzGeralds of Desmond O'Byrnes; Spain; Papal States allied Irish clans	Kingdom of England; Kingdom of Ireland allied Irish clans	Defeat: Famine throughout Munster; Plantation of Munster; Irish military diaspora in Spain
Revolution of the Seven Chiefs (1580)	Spanish Empire: (Spanish Empire) Peru; (Spanish Empire) Río de la Plata and Paraguay Governorate	Rebel Criollos	Victory
War of the Portuguese Succession (1580–1583): Battle of Alcântara; Capture of Oporto; Battle of Salga; Battle of Ponta Delgada; Conquest of the Azores; Location: Iberian Peninsula (mostly Portugal) and Atlantic Ocean	Spain; Portugal loyal to Philip of Spain	Portugal loyal to Prior of Crato; France; England; Dutch Republic	Victory: The Iberian Union: Acquisition of the Kingdom of Portugal and its colonial possessions by Philip II of Spain
Ribagorza War (1580–91) Location: Iberian Peninsula	(Spain) Spanish Crown	County of Ribagorza	Victory: Fernando de Gurrea y Aragón renounce to his claims in favour to the Crown
Chamuscado and Rodríguez Expedition (1581–82) Location: North America (modern New Mexico)	Spain: New Spain; Indian auxiliaries: Tiwa Puebloans	La Junta Indians: Jumanos; Apache: Querecho Indians; Pueblo Indians: Acoma Pueblo; Zuni people; Uto-Aztecan: Hopi	Stalemate: Spaniards lose some soldiers and could not make great demands to the Indigenous peoples in the zone, but success in establishing some settlements in the region.
Viltipoco Rebellion (1582) Location: South America (modern Argentine Northwest)	Spanish Empire: (Spanish Empire) Peru; (Spanish Empire) Tucuman Governorate	Omaguacas	Victory
Conflicts against Pirates in Argentina (1582–1724) Location: Modern Argentina	Spanish Empire: (Spanish Empire) Río de la Plata and Paraguay Governorate	European Pirates and Corsairs (mostly English, French, Danish and Portuguese)	Stalemate Mostly repelled: The island Martín García remains in Spanish control; Foundation of Montevideo
1582 Cagayan battles (1582) Location: Philippines	Spain: New Spain; (Spain) Spanish Philippines; Indian auxiliaries from Mexico (mostly Tlaxcalans)	(Japan) Wokou (Japanese, Chinese, and Korean pirates)	Victory
Ternate expedition (1582) Location: Maluku Islands	Spain: (Spain) Spanish Philippines	Sultanate of Ternate	Defeat
Cologne War (1583–88) Location: Germany	Ernst of Bavaria Prince-Elector, Cologne, 1583–1612; House of Wittelsbach; Free Imperial City of Cologne; Philip of Spain, and for him: House of Farnese; House of Isenburg-Grenzau; House of Mansfeld (main line); House of Berlaymont-Flyon and others	Gebhard, Truchsess von Waldburg, Prince-Elector, Cologne 1578–1588; House of Neuenahr-Alpen; House of Waldburg; House of Palatinate-Zweibrücken House of Nassau; House of Solms-Braunfels and others	Victory
Anglo-Spanish War (1585–1604): Newfoundland expedition (1585); Battle of San Juan de Ulúa; Battle of São Vicente; Battle of Cornwall; Battle of Santo Domingo; Battle of Cartagena de Indias; Raid on St. Augustine; Battle of Pantelleria (1586); Singeing the King of Spain's Beard; Spanish Armada; Spanish Armada in Ireland; Watts' West Indies and Virginia expedition; Blockade of Western Cuba; Raid on Puerto Caballos; Action of Faial; Action of San Mateo Bay; Capture of Recife; Raleigh's El Dorado Expedition; Action off Bermuda; Battle of Las Palmas; Capture of Santiago; Preston–Somers Expedition; Battle of the Guadalupe Island; Battle of San Juan; Battle of Pinos; Capture of Cádiz; 2nd Spanish Armada; 3rd Spanish Armada; Battle of San Juan; English Armada; Raid on Tabasco; Battle of Flores; Battle of Flores; Capture of Portobello; Battle of Sesimbra Bay; Battle of Puerto Caballos; Raid on Santiago de Cuba; Battle of the Gulf of Cadiz; Location: British Isles, Low Countries, France, Italian Peninsula, Iberian Peninsula, Mediterranean Sea, Atlantic Ocean and Americas	(Spain) Spanish Empire: (Spain) Spanish Netherlands; (Spain) Spanish American colonies; Kingdom of Portugal; State of Brazil; Kingdom of Naples; Duchy of Parma; Grand Duchy of Tuscany; Duchy of Savoy; Duchy of Castro; (Sovereign Military Order of Malta) Order of Saint John co-belligerent: French rebels; Irish rebels	Kingdom of England (Kingdom of Ireland) Ireland co-belligerent: United Provinces; (Kingdom of France) France; (Portugal) Portuguese rebels	Indecisive: Status quo ante bellum; Treaty of London
War of the Three Henrys (1585–1589): Part of French Wars of Religion and Anglo-Spanish War (1585–1604); Location: France	Catholics (Henry I, Duke of Guise): Catholic League; Spain; Duchy of Savoy	Politiques (Henry III of France): Kingdom of France Protestants (Henry of Navarre): Huguenots; England	Military stalemate Political defeat: House of Bourbon replaces the House of Valois as the Royal House of France.; Isabella Clara Eugenia claims to the throne in the Estates General of 1593 are rejected by Parlement of Paris.
Sack of Lanzarote (1586) Location: Canary Islands	Spain	Regency of Algiers	Defeat
Revolt of the Lakans (1587–1588) Location: Philippines	Spanish Empire: Spanish encomenderos	Tondo polity: Tagalog maginoos	Victory: Tondo dissolved and became a direct territory under the Spanish Empire
War of the Succession of Henry IV of France (1589–1594): Part of French Wars of Religion and Anglo-Spanish War (1585–1604); Location: France and Low Countries	Catholics: Catholic League Spain: (Spain) Spanish Netherlands	(Kingdom of France) Politiques and Protestants: Huguenots England	Militarily inconclusive: Start of a Franco-Spanish War in 1595 in defense of Catholic resistance remnants.; Political defeat: Protestant favorite, Henry IV of France, is recognised as king in most of France after converting to Catholicism, instead of catholic favorite and pro-Spanish, Isabella Clara Eugenia.
Brittany Campaign (1590–1598): Part of Anglo-Spanish War (1585–1604) and French Wars of Religion; Location: France (Brittany)	Spanish Empire Catholic League	Kingdom of France Huguenots; Kingdom of England	Inconclusive: Spaniards retreated after Peace of Vervins and the claims of succession over the Duchy of Brittany are ignored.
Alterations of Aragon (1591–92) Location: Iberian Peninsula	(Spain) Spanish Crown: Kingdom of Aragon	Diputación del General del Reino de Aragón	Victory: Courts of Tarazona solves Problem of the foreign vice-roy.
Battle of Cape Paracel (1591): part of Lê–Mạc WarLocation: Cochinchina (near of Paracel Islands)	Kingdom of Champa Supported by: Lê dynasty Spanish Empire	Ming China Supported by: Mạc dynasty Kingdom of Cambodia	Victory: Pedro Ordóñez de Ceballos defeat the hostile navies raiding Tonkin.
Siamese–Cambodian War (1591–1594) Location: Southeast Asia (modern Cambodia)	Kingdom of Cambodia Supported by: Spanish Empire: Kingdom of Portugal	Ayutthaya Kingdom	Defeat: Satha I is destroyed by Siam forces. He then sought a Spanish protectorate, starting Cambodian–Spanish War.
Luxemburg campaigns (1593–1595): Part of Eighty Years' War and French Wars of Religion; Location: Low Countries (Modern Luxembourg and Belgium)	Spain: (Spain) Spanish Netherlands; Prince-Bishopric of Liège (1595)	Dutch States Army Duchy of Bouillon Kingdom of France (1595)	Victory
Sino-Spanish conflicts (1593–18th century) Location: Philippine Sea	Spanish Empire: Philippines	Ming China: Kingdom of Tungning; Supported by: Chinese in the Philippines Sultanate of Sulu	Victory: Chinese attempts to conquer the islands are cancelled.; Anti-Spanish revolts from Chinese colonies in the Philippines are defeated.; Pagan chineses are expelled from the islands after Anti-Chinese paranoia on Spanish governors.
Cambodian–Spanish War (1593–99) Location: Southeast Asia (modernCambodia)	Spanish Empire: Spanish protectorate in Cambodia; Philippines; Mexican recruits; Kingdom of Portugal; Cambodian allies Japanese mercenaries	Cambodia Supported by: Ayutthaya Kingdom Johor Sultanate (Muslim Malay merchants) Kingdom of Champa (Muslim Cham merchants)	Defeat
Long Turkish War (1593–1606): includes Bocskai uprising; Location: Eastern Europe (mostly modern Romania)	Holy Roman Empire: Habsburg Monarchy; Saxony; Grand Duchy of Tuscany; Duchy of Ferrara; Duchy of Mantua; Duchy of Savoy; Knights of St. Stephen; Kingdom of Hungary; Kingdom of Croatia; Duchy of Carniola; Principality of Transylvania Wallachia Moldavia France Spain: (Spain) Spanish Netherlands; (Spain) Spanish Italy; Kingdom of Sicily; Kingdom of Naples; Zaporozhian Cossacks Serbian hajduks Papal States	Ottoman Empire: Khanate of Crimea	Inconclusive: Peace of Zsitvatorok
Humana and Leyva expedition (1594–1595) Location: North America (modern New Mexico)	Spain Pueblo Indians	Apache	Defeat
Irish Nine Years' War (1594–1603): Siege of Kinsale; Battle of Castlehaven; Part of Tudor conquest of Ireland and Anglo-Spanish War (1585–1604); Location: Ireland (island)	Alliance of Gaelic Irish clans (Spain) Spain; Scottish Gaelic mercenaries	Kingdom of England; Kingdom of Ireland	Defeat: Treaty of Mellifont (1603); Flight of the Earls (1607)
Franco-Spanish War (1595–1598): Battle of Fontaine-Française; Siege of Le Catelet; Siege of Doullens; Siege of Calais; Siege of Amiens; Part of French Wars of Religion and Eighty Years' War; Location: France and Low Countries	(Spain) Spanish Empire: County of Burgundy	Kingdom of France; Huguenots; Kingdom of England Dutch Republic	Defeat: Peace of Vervins
Himara Revolt of 1596: Part of Long Turkish War; Location: Albania and Adriatic Sea	Himariots Supported by: Greek revolters (Spain) Spanish Empire: (Spain) Spanish Italy; Kingdom of Sicily; Kingdom of Naples	Ottoman Empire: (Ottoman Empire) Ottoman Albania	Defeat
Conquest of New Mexico (1598–1606) Location: North America (Great Plains)	Spanish Empire: New Spain; Indian auxiliaries	Pueblo Indians: Acoma Pueblo; Hopi Zuni Apache Wichita people Escanjaque (Spain) Spanish slavers and mutineers	Victory
Acoma War (1598–99) Location: North America	Spanish Empire: New Spain	Acoma	Victory
Destruction of the Seven Cities (1598–1600): Part of Arauco War; Location: Southern Chile	(Spain) Spanish Empire: (Spain) Captaincy General of Chile	Mapuche people Huilliche people	Defeat: Spaniards are expelled of the region, being Biobío River the new frontier between Spanish Empire and Araucan indigenous domains.
Spanish-Portuguese conflict on China (1598–1600) Location: China	(Spain) Spanish Empire: (Spain) El Piñal; (Spain) Captaincy General of the Philippines	Portuguese Empire: Macau; Portuguese India	Defeat: End of Spain's attempts to circumvent the restrictions placed on them from reaching China.; Portuguese monopoly on the 16th century China trade seizured.
Franco-Savoyard War (1600–1601) Location: Northern Italy	Duchy of SavoySupported by: Spain	France	Treaty of Lyon: Marquisate of Saluzzo goes to Savoy in exchange for territorial cessions in the Alps, blocking the Spanish Road.
Apache–Mexico Wars (1600–1915): Part of Mexican Indian Wars and American Indian Wars; Location: North America	Crown of Castile (1600–1716); Spain (1716–1821) Mexico (1821–1915) United States (1850–1924) Confederate States (1861–1865)	Apache	Spanish/Mexican victory
Navajo Wars (1600–1866): Part of American Indian Wars; Location: North America	Crown of Castile (1600–1716); Spain (1716–1821); Mexico (1821–1848); United States (1849–1866)	Navajo	United States victory: Navajo moved to reservations and United
Acaxee Rebellion (1601–1603): Part of Indigenous rebellion on Mexico and Central America; Location: North America	Spanish Empire: New Spain	Acaxee Indians	Victory
Spanish expedition to Florida of 1601 Location: North America, Spanish missions in Georgia	(Spain) Spanish Empire: (Spain) Spanish Florida	Hostile Indians	Victory
Igorot revolt (1601): part of Igorot resistance to Spanish colonization; Location: Philippines	(Spain) Spanish Empire: (Spain) Filipino loyalists (Pangasinan, Kapampangan)	Igorot people rebel forces: Bontoc; Ibaloi; Ifugao; Ibilao	Defeat
Dutch–Portuguese War (1602–63): Recapture of Bahia; Battle of Abrolhos; Siege of Salvador; Action of 12–17 January 1640; Part of Eighty Years' War and Thirty Years' War outside Europe; Location: South America (mostly Modern Brazil), Atlantic Ocean, Africa (mostly Modern Angola), Asia (mostly Modern India, China, Indonesia)	Kingdom of Portugal: Brazilian colonial forces; (Portugal) Portuguese Angola; Supported by: (Spain) Spanish Empire (until 1640) Kingdom of Cochin; Ming China; Hormuz; Potiguara Tupis	Dutch Republic: Dutch East Indies; Dutch West Indies; Dutch Brazil; Supported by: Kingdom of England (until 1640); France (until 1640) Johor Sultanate; Ternate; Ayutthaya; Kingdom of Kandy; Sitawaka; Jaffna; Kingdom of Kongo; Kingdom of Ndongo; Rio Grande Tupis Nhandui Tarairiu Tribe	Pirric Victory: Treaty of Hague; Formation of the Dutch Empire; Causes of Portuguese Restoration War against Spain.; Portuguese-Spanish victory in South America and Africa; Dutch victory in the east
Battle of L'Escalade (1602) Location: Geneva, Switzerland	Duchy of Savoy (Spain) Spanish Empire: Duchy of Milan	Old Swiss Confederacy: Canton of Geneva	Defeat: Savoy fails in their attempt to conquer Geneva, and the Spanish Road is closed in the Western Alps route.
Ternate expedition (1603) Location: Southeast Asia, Maluku Islands (modern Indonesia)	(Spain) Spanish Empire: (Spain) Spanish East Indies		
Sangley Rebellion (1603) Location: Philippines	Spanish Empire: New Spain; (Spain) Spanish East Indies; (Japan) Japanese mercenaries	Chinese rebels: Sangley	Victory
Antarctic Expedition of the Armada del Mar del Sur to the South Seas and Terra Australis (1603) Location: South America and Antarctic seas	(Spain) Spanish Empire: (Spain) Viceroyalty of Peru; (Spain) Captaincy General of Chile	(Dutch Republic) Dutch corsairs	Inconclusive: First western sightings of Antarctica; Peruvian presence on Antarctica.
Moroccan civil war (1603–1627) Location: North Africa, Morocco	Mohammed esh Sheikh el Mamun and Abdallah al-Ghalib II forces from Fez Supported by: (Spain) Iberian Union; Tuscany	Zidan Abu Maali forces from Marrakesh Sidi al-Ayachi rebel forces: Republic of Salé independentists; Supported by: Kingdom of England; Dutch Republic; France; Morisco; Ahmed ibn Abi Mahalli rebel forces: anti-Saadi Marabouts	Military Defeat: Death of Mohammed esh Sheikh el Mamun.; Independence of morisco Republic of Salé and minor emirates (Illigh, Alawi, Zawiya Dila'iya, etc.).; Conflict ceases with Mohammed esh-Sheikh es-Seghir reign.; Economical Victory: Moroccan Cession of Larache and Mehdya to Spain.; Zaydani Library is placed in possession of Spaniards and moved to El Escorial.
Spanish-Barbary Wars (1605–1792): Battle of Hammamet; Raid on La Goulette (1609); Raid on La Goulette (1612); Raid on La Goulette (1615); Raid on La Goulette (1617); Sack of Lanzarote; Battle of Chios (1621); Battle of Palermo (1624); Battle of the Gulf of Tunis; Battle of the Dalmatian Coast; Action of 3 October 1624; Battle of Larache (1631); Battle of Maâmora (1631); Siege of Larache (1655); Siege of Larache (1657); Siege of Larache (1666); Siege of Oran and Mers el-Kébir (1675–1678); Siege of Maâmora (1681); Siege of Larache (1689); Sieges of Ceuta (1694–1727); Siege of the Peñón de Vélez (1702); Siege of Oran (1707–1708); Spanish conquest of Oran (1732); Action of 28 November 1751; Battle of Cape Palos (1758); Siege of Melilla (1774–1775); Invasion of Algiers (1775); Bombardment of Algiers (1783); Bombardment of Algiers (1784); Siege of Ceuta (1790–1791); Algerian reconquest of Oran and Mers el-Kébir (1790–1792); Location: North Africa (Barbary Coast)	(Spain) Spanish Empire: (Spain) Spanish Italy; Supported by: Papal States Kingdom of France Knights Hospitaller Kingdom of Sicily Tuscany Kingdom of Portugal	Barbary Coast: Regency of Algiers; Regency of Tunis; Sultanate of Morocco; Republic of Salé; Supported by: Ottoman Empire Barbary pirates Great Britain	Stalemate and mostly Status quo ante bellum
Devastations of Osorio (1605–1606) Location: Hispaniola	(Spain) Spanish Empire: (Spain) Captaincy General of Santo Domingo	Pirates	Defeat: Pirate settlements aren't dismantled.
Spanish conquest of Ternate and Jailolo (1606–1611): Spanish conquest of the Moluccas; Location: Southeast Asia, Maluku Islands (modern Indonesia)	Spanish Empire: New Spain; (Spain) Spanish East Indies; (Spain) Filipino loyalists (Boholanos); Sultanate of Tidore; (Japan) Japanese mercenaries	Sultanate of Ternate: Jailolo Sultanate; Moro people (Dutch Republic) Dutch Empire: Dutch East India Company	Victory: Sultan Saidi Berkat captured by Pedro Bravo de Acuña and exiled to Manila.; Mole Majimu took over or received back a number of territories previously held by Ternate, such as parts of Makian, Mayu island, and a section of Morotai.; Start of Spanish-Ternatean conflicts until the 1660s, through Mudafar Syah I proclamation of Sultan of Ternate with Dutch recognition.; The island was divided between the two powers: the Spaniards were allied with Tidore and the Dutch with their Ternaten allies. Spanish colonization until 1663.
Japanese insurrection in Philippines (1606) Location: Philippines	(Spain) Spanish Empire: (Spain) Spanish East Indies	(Japan) Japanese in the Philippines	Inconclusive
War of the Jülich Succession (1609–1614): Siege of Aachen; Location: Germany	1610: Supporting Emperor Rudolf: Holy Roman Empire; Principality of Strasbourg; Prince-Bishopric of Liège 1613–1614: Supporting Wolfgang William: Spain; Palatinate-Neuburg; Catholic League	1610: Opposed to Emperor Rudolph: Margraviate of Brandenburg; Palatinate-Neuburg; United Provinces; Kingdom of France; England; Protestant Union 1613–1614: Supporting John Sigismund: Margraviate of Brandenburg; United Provinces; England; Protestant Union	Victory: Treaty of Xanten; Cleves-Mark and Ravensberg to John Sigismund.; Jülich-Berg and Ravenstein to Wolfgang William.; Wesel under Spanish control.
Spanish-Ottoman War (1610–1614): Battle of Cape Corvo; Rebellion of Osarto Justiniano (1611); Location: Mediterranean Sea and Balkans (near modern Turkey and Greece)	Spain: (Spain) Spanish Italy; Kingdom of Sicily; Greek and Albanian rebels	Ottoman Empire: Egypt Eyalet; Regency of Tunis; Ottoman Greece; Ottoman Albania	Spanish victory
Arganda Revolt (1613) Location: Arganda del Rey	Spain: Duke of Lerma	Mutiners of Arganda del Rey village	Inconclusive
War of the Montferrat Succession (1613–1617): Spanish-Savoian War (1615–1617); Location: Italian Peninsula	Supporting the Duke of Mantua: Duchy of Mantua Montferrat Tuscany (1613) (Spain) Spanish Empire France (1613–14) Holy Roman Empire Kingdom of Naples Genoa	Supporting the Duke of Savoy: Duchy of Savoy Montferrat Tuscany (1613) France (1615–17) Venice	Peace of Asti
Dutch-Ternatean invasions of Spanish Tidore (1613–1614) Location: Molucca Sea, Maluku Islands (Modern Indonesia)	(Spain) Spanish Empire: (Spain) Spanish East Indies; Sultanate of Tidore	(Dutch Republic) Dutch Empire: (Dutch Republic) Dutch East India Company; Sultanate of Ternate; Sultanate of Bacan	Victory: Dutch presence on Tidore Island ended in 1621.
Conquest of La Mamora (1614) Location: North Africa (Morocco)	Spain	Saadi dynasty	Victory
Slaying of the Spaniards (1615): Part of Basque Whalin in Iceland; Location: Iceland, Westfjords	Spain	Denmark–Norway: Norwegian Iceland	Defeat
Uskok War (1615–1617) Location: Adriatic Sea (near modern Croatia)	Kingdom of Croatia (Spain) Spanish Empire: Kingdom of Naples; Holy Roman Empire	Republic of Venice United Provinces; England	Victory: Treaty of Madrid (1617); Many Uskok pirates executed or exiled; Start of Spanish-Venetian War (1617–1621)
Battle of Cape Celidonia (1616) Location: Mediterranean Sea (near modern Turkey)	(Spain) Spanish Empire: Kingdom of Naples	Ottoman Empire	Victory
Raid on Constantinople (1616) Location: Mediterranean Sea, Bosporus and Egypt	(Spain) Spanish Empire: Kingdom of Naples	Ottoman Empire	Victory
Tepehuán Revolt (1616–1620): Part of Indigenous rebellion on Mexico and Central America; Location: North America	Spanish Empire: New Spain	Tepehuánes	Victory
Spanish-Venetian War (1617–1621): Battle of Ragusa; Battle of Gibraltar (1618); part of Venetian-Habsburg conflicts; Location: Adriatic Sea (near modern Croatia)	(Spain) Spanish Empire: Kingdom of Naples	Republic of Venice Supported by: United Provinces Ottoman Empire	Inconclusive due to Conspiracy of Venice.
Spanish conquest of Petén (1618–1697) Location: Central America	Spain	Independent Maya, including: Itza people; Kowoj people; Kejache people; Yalain people; Lakandon Chʼol people; Manche Ch'ol people	Victory: Incorporation of the Petén Basin into the Captaincy General of Guatemala.
Spanish–Ottoman War (1618–1619): Attack on Sousse (1619); Location: Mediterranean Sea	Spanish Empire: Kingdom of Naples; Kingdom of Sicily; Grand Duchy of Tuscany (Sovereign Military Order of Malta) Knights Hospitaller Papal States	Ottoman Empire: Tunisia	Inconclusive
Thirty Years' War (1618–48): Thirty Years' War outside Europe; Part of the Religious wars in Europe and Eighty Years' War; Location: All Europe: Central Europe (modern Czech Republic, Germany, Switzerland, Austria and Hungary), Eastern Europe (modern Romania), Italian Peninsula, Low Countries, France, Scandinavia, Iberian Peninsula, English Channel, Baltic Sea and Mediterranean Sea. Also the Americas	Pro-Habsburg alliance prior to 1635: Habsburg Monarchy; (Spain) Spanish Empire; Bavaria; Catholic League; Post-1635 Peace of Prague: Holy Roman Empire; (Spain) Spanish Empire	Anti-Habsburg alliance prior to 1635 (Note: States that fought against the emperor at some point between 1618 and 1635.): (Kingdom of Bohemia) Bohemia; (Swedish Empire) Sweden; Palatinate; (Duchy of Savoy) Savoy; Dutch Republic; Denmark–Norway; Heilbronn League; Hesse-Kassel; Brandenburg-Prussia; Saxony; Post-1635 Peace of Prague: France; (Swedish Empire) Sweden; Dutch Republic; Hesse-Kassel	Defeat: Spain continues to be at war with France; Peace of Westphalia and Peace of Münster; Major territorial gains for France, Sweden and Brandenburg; Reduction in Habsburg Power
Bündner Wirren (1618–1639): Part of Thirty Years' War and Franco-Spanish War; Location: Switzerland (Grisons)	Grison rebels Holy Roman Empire: Archduchy of Austria; Spain: Duchy of Milan	The Three Leagues France Venice Savoy	Stalemate: Capitulation of Milan; The subjugated territories were returned to the Three Leagues after expelling the French, but with restrictions on the sovereign rights of the leagues (the Three Leagues effectively became a protectorate of Austria and Spain).; The Spanish representative in the Duchy of Milan was granted a right of supervision over the administration of Graubünden and a right of protection over Catholic subjects. Spain also received permission to recruit mercenaries and the right to use roads and mountain passes. These should remain closed to all enemies of Spain
Valtellina War (1620–26): Part of Thirty Years' War and Bündner Wirren; Location: Switzerland and Northern Italy	Papal States; Holy Roman Empire: Archduchy of Austria; Spain: Duchy of Milan; Republic of Genoa	The Three Leagues France; Venice; Savoy	Treaty of Monzón
Tamblot Uprising (1621) Location: Philippines	(Spain) Spanish Empire: (Spain) Filipino loyalists	Pagans forces (mostly Boholanos) lidered by the babaylan Tamblot	Victory: Repression against Filipino shamans.
Portuguese–Safavid War (1621–1630): Part of Safavid–Portuguese conflicts and Anglo-Portuguese rivalry in the Persian Gulf; Location: West Asia, Strait of Hormuz	(Spain) Iberian Union: Council of Portugal; Kingdom of Ormus	Safavid Persia East India Company	Defeat
War of the Vicuñas and Basques (1622–1625) Location: South America (modern Bolivia)	(Spain) Spanish Empire: (Spain) Viceroyalty of Peru; Basques	"Vicuñas": non-Basque elite (Castillians, Andalusians, Extremadurans, Criollos, Mestizos and Indigenous)	Victory of the Government
Sacalum Rebellion (1624) Location: Mesoamerica	Spanish Empire: New Spain; (Spain) Captaincy General of Yucatán	Maya peoples	Victory
Spanish-Siam War (1624–1636) Location: Southeast Asia (modern Thailand)	(Spain) Iberian Union: (Spain) Spanish East Indies; Council of Portugal; Macau; Goa; Malacca	Siam (Dutch Republic) Dutch East India Company	Defeat: Dutch hegemony on Southeast Asia.
First Genoese–Savoyard War (1625): Part of Thirty Years' War; Location: Italian Peninsula	Spain; Republic of Genoa	Kingdom of France; Duchy of Savoy	Victory: France surrenders its claims on Savoy and withdraws its troops from the Piedmont and the Republic of Genoa, stipulated by the Treaty of Monzón; Reconquest of some territories in the French Riviera by the combined forces of Spain and the Republic of Genoa
Anglo-Spanish War (1625–30): Part of Thirty Years' War; Location: Low Countries, Atlantic Ocean (English Channel), Americas (Spanish Main) and Iberian Peninsula	Spain	England; United Provinces	Victory: Treaty of Madrid; Spain seeks and signs peace treaty with England in light of imminent war with France; Treaty of Madrid, similar to previous Anglo-Spanish treaty although somewhat less strict regarding trade
Spanish expedition to Formosa (1626) Location: Modern Taiwan	(Spain) Spanish Empire: (Spain) Spanish East Indies	Kingdom of Middag	Victory: Spanish establishment in Formosa until Dutch conquest in 1642.
3rd Huguenot rebellion (1627–29): Siege of La Rochelle; Part of Anglo-Spanish War (1625–1630) and Anglo-French War (1627–1629); Location: France	France Spain	Huguenots England	Victory: Peace of Alès
War of the Mantuan Succession (1628–31): Battle of Veillane; Part of Thirty Years' War; Location: Italian Peninsula	Supporting the Duke of Guastalla: Holy Roman Empire; Spain; Duchy of Savoy	Supporting the Duke of Nevers: France; Republic of Venice	Defeat, Treaty of Cherasco: Duke of Nevers recognized as ruler of Mantua
Polish-Spanish joint fleet operations in the North (1628–32): Part of Polish–Swedish War (1626–1629), Dutch–Portuguese War and Thirty Years' War/Eighty Years' War; Location: North and Baltic Sea, North European Plain	Polish–Lithuanian Commonwealth (Spain) Iberian/Spanish Empire: (Spain) Spanish Netherlands; Kingdom of Portugal; Supported by: Holy Roman Empire Catholic League	Sweden Denmark–Norway; United Provinces England Supported by: Kingdom of Scotland; Protestant German States: Stralsund; Hanseatic League	Defeat: Both powers are incapable to avoid the Swedish intervention in the Thirty Years' War or defy the policy of Dominium maris baltici from Nordic Powers and Hanseatic League, being unable to challenge their naval dominance in the Baltic Sea.; Polish–Lithuanian Commonwealth Navy is destroyed by Danish forces. Also House of Vasa's plans to invade Sweden (to re-catholicize them and restore Polish–Swedish union) with Habsburg help are cancelled.; Spanish Habsburg plans over the Baltics (attempts to gain fiefs on Imperial occupied Götaland, Jutland or Pomerania for the Council of Flanders) are cancelled. Also proposals to develop a Hanseatic-Iberian Company are rejected. Spain ceases to be a dominant power in the remote Baltic Sea region, strengthening the Dutch and English power.; Habsburg plans to develop a pro-Imperial and Catholic Navy in Northern Germany are cancelled after conflicts with Albrecht von Wallenstein.
Motim das Maçarocas (1629) Location: Iberian Peninsula	(Spain) Iberian Union: Council of Portugal	(Portugal) Portuguese independentists	Victory
Jolo expedition (1630): Part of Spanish–Moro conflict; Location: Jolo, Philippines	(Spain) Spanish Empire: (Spain) Spanish East Indies	Sultanate of Sulu	Defeat
Republic of Salé Internal conflicts (1630–1668) Location: North Africa	Morisco/Andalusians party Supported by: Spain; Ottoman Algiers; Zawiya Dila'iya; Saadi Sultanate	Republic of Salé: Hornacheros elite party; Supported by: England; Dutch Republic; Alawi	Stalemate: Sidi al-Ayachi (pro-Hornacheros Divan) dies after Morisco rebellion, but Al Walid ben Zidan fails to reconquer Republic of Salé for Saadi Morocco.; Dila'iya establish a sphere of influence for a short time during reign of Mohammed al-Hajj ibn Mohammed al-Dila'i.; Al-Rashid of Morocco conquers from Dila'iya the Salé territory. Then annex it for Alawi Morocco.; Spain fails to make a Protectorate over a Morisco controlled Republic of Salé.
Salt Tax Revolt (1631–34) Location: Iberian Peninsula (Portugal)	Spain	Biscayan rebels	Victory
Naval war on Lake Constance (1632–1648): Part of Thirty Years' War; Location: Lake Constance	Holy Roman Empire: Austria; Bavaria; (Spain) Spanish Empire: Milan; Old Swiss Confederacy: Catholic Cantons	Württemberg Sweden France Old Swiss Confederacy: Protestant Cantons	Stalemate
War of Ten Years (1634–1644): Part of Thirty Years' War and Franco-Spanish War; Location: Franche-Comté	(Spain) Spanish Empire: County of Burgundy; Holy Roman Empire: Duchy of Lorraine; Electorate of Bavaria	France Weimar Army: Saxony; Sweden	Statu quo ante bellum: Spain maintains the control of the Franche-Comté, but the region was devastated and in economic ruin.
Franco-Spanish War (1635–59): Part of Thirty Years' War and Wars of Louis XIV; Location: Iberian Peninsula (mostly Catalonia and Pyrenees), Italian Peninsula, Northern France, Rhineland, Low Countries, Atlantic Ocean, Mediterranean Sea	Spanish Empire: (Spain) Spanish Netherlands; (Spain) Spanish Italy; New Spain; Modena and Reggio (1635–46) Holy Roman Empire (until 1648) English Royalists (from 1657)	France; Dutch Republic (until 1648); Duchy of Savoy; Duchy of Modena (1647–1649 and 1655–1659); Duchy of Parma (1635–1637); Commonwealth of England (1654–59); Principality of Catalonia (from 1640) Kingdom of Portugal (1640–59)	Treaty of the Pyrenees France annexes Artois in addition to other smaller territories from the Spanish Netherlands and Roussillon
Capture of Tortuga (1635) Location: Caribbean	(Spain) Spanish Empire	France England	Victory
Manuelinho Revolt (1637) Location: Iberian Peninsula (Portugal)	(Spain) Iberian Union: Council of Portugal	(Portugal) Portuguese independentists	Victory
Sack of Calpe (1637) Location: Iberian Peninsula (Valencia)	Spain	Algerian Barbary pirates	Defeat
Spanish campaigns in Lanao (1637–1639): Spanish occupation of Jolo; Location: Philippines	Spanish Empire: New Spain; (Spain) Philippines; (Spain) Peru; (Spain) Panama; Supported by: Republic of Genoa	Confederate States of Lanao Supported by: (Dutch Republic) Dutch Empire	Stalemate: Failure of the conquest and Christianize the Maranao people; Truce is reached to stop Muslim raids against Zamboanga and Chavacano people. Fort Pilar is seizured.
2nd Sangley Rebellion (1639): Part of Sino-Spanish conflicts and Philippine revolts against Spain; Location: Philippines, Luzon	(Spain) Spanish Empire: (Spain) Philippines; Sultanate of Sulu: Jolo; (Japan) Japanese in the Philippines	Chinese rebels: Sangley	Victory
Piedmontese Civil War (1639–42): Siege of Turin; Part of Thirty Years' War and Franco-Spanish War; Location: Italian Peninsula	Spain; Prince Thomas faction	France (Duchy of Savoy) Regency faction	Defeat: Christine confirmed as regent; Thomas agrees to fight for France
Christianshavn Incident (1640) Location: Canary Islands	(Spain) Spanish Empire	Denmark-Norway	Victory
Catalan Revolt (1640–59): Battle of Cambrils; Battle of Montjuïc; Naval Battle of Tarragona; Battle of Tarragona; Battle of Montmeló; Siege of Perpignan; Battle of Barcelona; Battle of Lerida; Siege of Lleida; Siege of Barcelona; Part of Thirty Years' War, Crisis of 1640 and Franco-Spanish War; Location: Iberian Peninsula (Catalonia) and Pyrenees	Spain	Principality of Catalonia; France	Victory: Revolt crushed; Treaty of the Pyrenees; County of Roussillon and the northern half of Cerdanya ceded to France
Portuguese Restoration War (1640–68): Siege of São Filipe; Battle of Montijo; Battle of Vilanova; Siege of Badajoz; Battle of the Lines of Elvas; Siege of Arronches; Battle of Ameixial; Siege of Évora; Battle of Castelo Rodrigo; Battle of Montes Claros; Battle of the Berlenga; Part of Thirty Years' War, Crisis of 1640 and Franco-Spanish War; Location: Iberian Peninsula	(Spain) Castile and Aragon	Kingdom of Portugal; Supported by: France (1641–59); Kingdom of England (after 1662)	Defeat: Treaty of Lisbon; Charles of Spain recognizes the sovereignty of the House of Braganza over Portugal and its colonial possessions; Portugal cedes Ceuta to Castile
Iberian capture of Providencia (1641) Location: Providencia Island, Colombia	(Spain) Spanish Empire (Portugal) Portuguese Empire	Providence Island colony Caribbean pirates and Privateer	Victory: Providence Island Company is dismantled.
Andalusian alterations (1647–52): Córdoba hunger riot (1652); Part of Crisis of 1640	Spain: Four Kingdoms of Andalusia	Peasant rebels	Stalemate: The king, aware of the situation, helps the city by buying wheat to make it cheaper and amnestying all the mutineers.
Neapolitan Revolt (1647–48): Part of Thirty Years' War, Crisis of 1640 and Franco-Spanish War; Location: Italian Peninsula	Spain	Neapolitan Republic; France	Victory: Revolt crushed
The Fronde (1648–1653): Part of The General Crisis and Franco-Spanish War; Location: France	Parlements (1648–1649); Princes of the Blood (1650–1653); Parti Dévot (Spain) Spanish Empire	Kingdom of France	Defeat: Revolt suppressed and instauration of Absolutism in France.
Wreckage of Kattan (1649): part of Swedish expedition to New Sweden (1649); Location:[Caribbean	(Spain) Spanish Empire: (Spain) Captaincy General of Puerto Rico; Pirates	(yes) Swedish Empire	Victory
Communera rebellion of Paraguay (1649–1650) Location: South America, Río de la Plata (modern Paraguay)	(Spain) Spanish Empire: (Spain) Viceroyalty of Peru; (Spain) Governorate of the Río de la Plata	Paraguayan comunero rebels	Victory
Anglo-Spanish War (1654–60): Siege of Santo Domingo; Invasion of Jamaica; Raid on Málaga; Battle of Cádiz; Battle of Santa Cruz de Tenerife; Battle of Ocho Rios; Battle of Rio Nuevo; Henry Morgan's raid on Puerto del Príncipe; Henry Morgan's raid on Porto Bello; Henry Morgan's raid on Lake Maracaibo; Henry Morgan's Panama expedition; Part of the Franco-Spanish War and British Interregnum; Location: Low Countries, Iberian Peninsula, Atlantic Ocean and Americas (Spanish Main)	Spain: New Spain; (Spain) Spanish Venezuela; (Spain) Peru; (Spain) New Kingdom of Granada; Royalists of England, Ireland and Scotland	Commonwealth of England France (1657–59)	Defeat: Treaties of Madrid (1667 and 1670); Acquisition of Jamaica, the Cayman Islands, Dunkirk and Mardyck by the Commonwealth of England
VOC-Tidore war (1653–1654) Location: Modern Indonesia	Sultanate of Tidore (Spain) Spanish Empire: (Spain) Spanish East Indies	(Dutch Republic) Dutch East India Company	Inconclusive
Mapuche uprising of 1655 (1655–1656): Part of Arauco War; Location: Southern Chile (Araucanía Region)	(Spain) Spanish Empire: (Spain) Viceroyalty of Peru; (Spain) Captaincy General of Chile	Mapuche rebels	Defeat: Beginning of a ten-year period of warfare between the Spanish and the Mapuche, led by Mestizo Alejo.; Start a civil war among the Spanish due to the deposition of Acuña from Royal Governor of Chile.
Tehuantepec Rebellion (1660–61)Location: Mexico	Spanish Empire: New Spain	(Spain) Cabildo de Indios under Zapotec peoples: Huaves; Zoques; Mixes	Victory: Indigenous and Spaniards are reconciled by the publication of a Real cédula against forced labors; Leaders of the rebellion are executed by the oidor Juan Francisco de Montemayor Cordoba and Cuenca.
Chinese piracy incursions and rebellions to the Philippines (1662–63) Location: Philippines	(Spain) Spanish Empire: (Spain) Spanish East Indies	(Japan) Koxinga's Chinese-Japanese pirate forces	Inconclusive: Koxinga's forces raided effectively several towns in the Philippines, but demanded tribute from the colonial government never accomplished and threatened invasion cancelled due to his death.; Spanish forces withdrawal from Spanish Formosa, Tidore, south Ternate, Mindanao. Then, permanently abandon their colony in the Maluku Islands and their fortress on Zamboanga, being an important factor in the Spanish failure to conquer the Muslim Moro people
Raid of Tangier (1662) Location: North Africa	Khadir Ghaïlan forces Supported by: Crown of Spain Saadi Morocco	Portuguese Empire: (Portugal) Portuguese Tangier; Supported by: Kingdom of England	Stalemate: Start of English occupation of Tangier.
Sack of Campeche (1663) Location: Mexico	Spain: New Spain	Kingdom of England	Defeat
Piracy attacks on Lake Nicaragua (1665–1857) Location: Central America	Spain: New Spain; (Spain) Captaincy General of Guatemala; Nicaragua Costa Rica El Salvador Guatemala	West Indies Pirates American Filibusters	Stalemate: Piracy and filibustering suppressed by 1857
Piracy attack on Maracaibo (1666) Location: Lake Maracaibo (Modern Venezuela)	(Spain) Spanish Empire: (Spain) Captaincy General of Venezuela	(Kingdom of France) French pirates	Defeat
War of Devolution (1667–68): Part of Wars of Louis XIV; Location: Low Countries	(Spain) Spanish Empire: (Spain) Spanish Netherlands; Triple Alliance: Dutch Republic; Kingdom of England (Sweden) Swedish Empire	France	Defeat: Treaty of Aix-la-Chapelle (1668); France gains Armentières, Bergues, Charleroi, Kortrijk, Douai, Veurne, Lille, Oudenaarde and Tournai
Revolts of the Angelets (1667–1675) Location: Roussillon	Northern Catalonia's peasants Supported by: Spain: Principality of Catalonia	France: Conseil souverain de Roussillon	Defeat: Consolidation of French hegemony in the Eastern Pyrenees.
Spanish–Chamorro Wars (1670–99) Location: Micronesia, Mariana Islands (Modern Guam and Northern Mariana Islands)	(Spain) Spanish Empire: Chamorro loyalists	Chamorros	Victory
Franco-Dutch War (1672–78): Second conquest of Franche-Comté; Siege of Maastricht; Siege of Bonn; Siege of Besançon; Battle of Seneffe; Battle of Stromboli; Battle of Augusta; Battle of Palermo; Siege of Cambrai; Siege of Ypres; Battle of Saint-Denis; Part of Wars of Louis XIV; Location: Western Europe (mostly Low Countries and Rhineland), North Sea, Americas, Caribbean Sea	Dutch Republic; Holy Roman Empire (from 1673): Electorate of Brandenburg-Prussia; Lorraine; Spain (from 1673): (Spain) Spanish Netherlands; County of Burgundy; Denmark–Norway (from 1675) England (1678)	France; Sweden (from 1674); England (1672–74); Bishopric of Münster (1672–1673); Archbishopric of Cologne (1672–1673)	Defeat: Treaty of Nijmegen: France gains Franche-Comté; Treaty of Westminster
Second Genoese–Savoyard War (1672–73) Location: Northern Italy	Republic of Genoa; Supported by: Spain	Duchy of Savoy	Victory: Status quo ante bellum
Messina revolt (1672–78): Part of Franco-Dutch War; Location: Southern Italy	(Spain) Spanish Empire: Kingdom of Sicily; Kingdom of Naples; Republic of Genoa	Messina city Partito dei Malvizzi France	Victory
Anti-Spanish rebellion in Franche-Comté (1673–1674): Part of Franco-Dutch WarLocation: Franche-Comté	Holy Roman Empire Spain: County of Burgundy; (Spain) Spanish Netherlands	Comtois rebels France	Defeat
Siege of Orán and Mers el-Kébir (1675–1678): Part of Spanish-Algerian conflicts	(Spain) Spanish Empire: (Spain) Spanish Oran	Ottoman Empire: Regency of Algiers	Inconclusive
Moulay Ismail Ibn Sharif Campaigns (1678–1727): Conquest of Medhya (1681); Siege of Larache (1689); Siege of Melilla (1694–1696); Sieges of Ceuta (1694–1727); Part of Spanish–Moroccan conflicts; Location: North Africa	(Spain) Spanish Empire Ottoman Empire: Regency of Algiers; Kingdom of England: English Tangier	Sultanate of Morocco	Stalemate
Chepo expedition (1679) Location: Central America	Spanish Empire: New Spain; (Spain) Captaincy General of Guatemala; (Spain) Peru; (Spain) New Kingdom of Granada	England Piracy	Defeat. Looting and then burning the town of Chepo, Panama.
First occupation of Sacramento Colony (1680) Location: Río de la Plata Basin (Modern Uruguay)	Spanish Empire: (Spain) Peru; (Spanish Empire) Río de la Plata Governorate; (Spanish Empire) Tucuman Governorate; (Spanish Empire) Paraguay Governorate; Jesuit missions among the Guaraní	Portuguese Empire: Colonial Brazil; Colonia del Sacramento	Military victory Political defeat: Spain temporary give back the territory to Portugal in the Lisbon Provisional Treaty of 1681. Then the Treaty of Lisbon (1701) makes it an absolute cession.; José de Garro is punished by his actions against luso-Brazilians.
Pueblo Revolt (1680): Part of Indigenous rebellion on Mexico and Central America; Location: North America	Spanish Empire: New Spain	Puebloans	Defeat: Expulsion of Spanish settlers
Combat of San Marcos de Arica (1681) Location: Modern Chile	(Spain) Spanish Empire: (Spain) Viceroyalty of Peru; (Spain) Captaincy General of Chile	England Piracy	Victory
Spanish-Brandenburg War (1680–1682): Action of 30 September 1681; Location: Atlantic Ocean (Mediterranean Sea, North Sea, Caribbean Sea)	(Spain) Spanish Empire	Brandenburg-Prussia Supported by: Denmark–Norway	Victory
Great Turkish War (1683–1699) Location: Central Europe and Eastern Europe	Holy Roman Empire: Habsburg monarchy; (Electorate of Bavaria) Bavaria; Franconia; Saxony; Swabia; Duchy of Styria; Royal Hungary; Kingdom of Croatia; Duchy of Mantua; Polish–Lithuanian Commonwealth; Tsardom of Russia: Cossack Hetmanate; Republic of Venice; Spanish Empire; Montenegro; Albanian rebels Serbian rebels Greek rebels Bulgarian rebels Romanian rebels Croatian rebels	Ottoman Empire Vassal states: Crimean Khanate; Shamkhalate of Tarki; Upper Hungary (1683–5); Moldavia; Wallachia; Transylvania	Victory: Treaty of Karlowitz; Ottoman decline in Europe; The Habsburg monarchy wins lands in Hungary, the Principality of Transylvania and the Balkans.; Poland-Lithuania captures Podolia.; Russia captures the port of Azov.; Venice captures Morea and inner Dalmatia.; Montenegro gains de facto independence.
War of the Reunions (1683–1684): Part of Wars of Louis XIV; Location: Western Europe (Mostly Low Countries)	(Spain) Spanish Empire: (Spain) Spanish Netherlands; Holy Roman Empire; Republic of Genoa	France	Defeat: Truce of Ratisbon; Spain cedes Luxembourg to France; Holy Roman Empire cedes Strasbourg to France
Raid on Charles Town (1684) Location: The Bahamas	(Spain) Spanish Empire: (Spain) Spanish Cuba	England: English West Indies	Victory
1686 Spanish Invasion of South Carolina Location: North America (South Carolina)	(Spain) Spanish Empire: (Spain) Spanish Florida; Timucua	England: Province of Carolina; Yamasee	Victory: Destruction of Stuart's Town.
Revolt of the Barretinas (1687–1689) Location: Iberian Peninsula	Spain: Kingdom of Aragon	Peasant rebels of Catalonia	Spanish Crown victory.
Nine Years' War (1688–97): Battle of Walcourt; Battle of Fleurus; Battle of Staffarda; Battle of Sabana Real; Siege of Mons; Siege of Cuneo; Siege of Namur; Battle of Marsaglia; Raid on Cartagena de Indias (1697); Part of Wars of Louis XIV; Location: Western Europe, British Isles, Americas, West Africa and India	Grand Alliance: Dutch Republic; England; New England; Holy Roman Empire; Spain; (Spain) Spanish Netherlands; (Spain) Viceroyalty of Peru; (Spain) New Kingdom of Granada; Piedmont-Savoy; Scotland	France: New France; Wabanaki Confederacy Irish and Scottish Jacobites	Indecisive: Treaty of Ryswick; Louis XIV recognizes William III of Orange as King of England, Scotland and Ireland; France retains Alsace (including Strasbourg) and surrenders Freiburg, Breisach and Philippsburg to the Holy Roman Empire, regains Pondicherry (after paying the Dutch a sum of 16,000 pagodas) and Nova Scotia; Spain recovered Catalonia from France, and the barrier fortresses of Mons, Luxembourg and Kortrijk; The Duchy of Lorraine was restored to Leopold Joseph from France; Spain officially ceded the western third of Hispaniola to France, establishing the Saint-Domingue colony on modern Haiti.
Second Brotherhood (1693) Location: Iberian Peninsula	Spain: Kingdom of Valencia	agermanats (peasant rebel forces)	Victory
Siege of Oran (1693): Part of Conflicts between the Regency of Algiers and Morocco; Location: North Africa (Algeria)	Spanish Empire: (Spain) Spanish Oran; Regency of Algiers	Sultanate of Morocco	Algerian-Spanish victory
Sieges of Ceuta (1694–1727) Location: North Africa	Spain: Bourbons (1704–1713)	Morocco; Supported by: England (from 1707)	Victory
Arena Massacre (1699): Part of Social unrest in Trinidad and Tobago; Location: Trinidad	Spanish Empire Catholic amerindians	Amerindian rebels	Pirric Victory
Darien scheme (1699–1700) Location: Panama	Spanish Empire: New Kingdom of Granada	Kingdom of Scotland: Company of Scotland	Victory: Failed attempt of Scottish colonization of the Americas, which were expelled of "New Caledonia".

== Bourbon Spain ==
Conflict	Combatant 1	Combatant 2	Results	Spanish casualties
Conspiracy of Macchia (1701) Location: Naples	Spain: Kingdom of Naples	Neapolitan nobles	Revolt suprossed by Bourbonic forces.	
War of the Spanish Succession (1701–14): Part of Wars of Louis XIV; Location: Western Europe, Central Europe, Americas, West Africa, East Indies and India	Kingdom of France: New France; (Kingdom of France) French East India Company; Spain loyal to Philip: Crown of Castile; Kingdom of Naples; Kingdom of Sicily; New Spain; (Spain) Peru; Bavaria (until 1704) Duchy of Mantua (until 1708) Cologne (until 1702) Liège (until 1702) co-belligerent: Kuruc (Kingdom of Hungary); Principality of Transylvania	Holy Roman Empire: Austria; Prussia (from 1702); Hanover; Great Britain (formed in 1707): England (until 1707); Scotland (until 1707); British America; British East India Company; Dutch Republic Duchy of Savoy (after 1703) Kingdom of Portugal (from 1703): State of Brazil; Spain loyal to Charles: Crown of Aragon; (Spain) Spanish Netherlands; (Denmark) Danish Auxiliary Corps co-belligerent: Hungarian Royalists; Kingdom of Croatia	Political victory for Spain loyal to Philip; Military victory for Spain loyal to Charles: Treaty of Utrecht (1713); Treaty of Rastatt (1714); Treaty of Baden (1714); Philip is recognised as King of Spain, but once more renounces any claim to the throne of France.; Spain and Britain sign the Asiento; Spain cedes the Spanish Netherlands, Kingdom of Naples, Duchy of Milan and Sardinia to the Habsburg monarchy, Sicily to the Duchy of Savoy and Gibraltar and Menorca to Britain; France recognizes British sovereignty over Rupert's Land and Newfoundland and cedes Acadia and its half of Saint Kitts to Great Britain.; The Dutch Republic retains various forts in the Southern Netherlands and annexes a part of Spanish Guelders.; Spain cedes the Colony of Sacramento to the Portuguese Empire; Constitutions of Catalonia are abolished due to the Nueva Planta decrees as a punishment for the War of the Catalans.	
Queen Anne's War (1702–1713): Battle of Flint River; Siege of St. Augustine; Apalachee massacre; Lefebvre's Charles Town expedition; Siege of Pensacola; Part of War of the Spanish Succession; Location: North America	France: New France; Spain: New Spain; Wabanaki Confederacy; Caughnawaga Mohawk; Choctaw; Timucua; Apalachee; Natchez	England (before 1707): English America; Great Britain (after 1707): British America; Muscogee (Creek); Chickasaw; Yamasee: Iroquois Confederacy	Defeat: France cedes control of Acadia, Newfoundland, Hudson Bay, and Saint Kitts to Britain.	
Protests and rebellions of the 18th century in the Viceroyalty of Peru (1700s)	Spanish Empire: (Spain) Viceroyalty of Peru	Rebellions of peruleros	Pyrrhic victory of the Viceroyalty authorities.: Partial reforms are given to appease the rebels, as well as severe punishments for repeat offender leaders, to prevent future insurrections among the local population.; Multiple social groups, dissatisfied with the Bourbon Reforms, would continue to rebel under the motto of "Long live the King, death to the bad government" for an improvement of the Spanish state in its compliance with the colonial pact between subject and monarch, longing for the previous "fueros" and local autonomies of the traditional Monarchy of the House of Austria against the thriving Bourbon Absolutism.; First notions of anti-colonial political independence in the most radical groups, usually influenced by the Spanish-American Enlightenment.	
Battle of the Yi (1702) Location: South America, Yí River (Modern Uruguay)	Spanish Empire: Río de la Plata Governorate; Guaraní Tribes	Charrúa Tribes	Stalemate: 300 Charrúas died during the negotiations; Decisive weakening of the Charrúa forces	
Second occupation of Sacramento Colony (1705): Part of the War of the Spanish Succession; Location: Río de la Plata Basin (Modern Uruguay)	Spanish Empire: Peru; Río de la Plata Governorate	Portuguese Empire: Colonial Brazil	Victory: Spaniards occupied Colonia del Sacramento until 1715.	
Comanche Wars (1700s–1870s): Part of the Texas–Indian wars; Location: North America	(Spain) Spanish Empire (until 1820) Mexico (since 1821) Republic of Texas (since 1836) Choctaw Republic United States (since 1845)	Comanche Other Indigenous nations	Defeat	
Apache Wars (1700s): Part of Mexican Indian Wars; Location: North America	Spanish Empire: New Spain	Apache	Defeat	
Siege of Oran (1707–1708) Location: North Africa (Algeria)	Kingdom of Spain: (Spain) Spanish Oran	Regency of Algiers: Beylik of Mascara	Defeat: Algerians conquers Oran.	
Pablo Presbere's insurrection (1709–1710): Part of Mexican Indian War and Indigenous rebellion on Mexico and Central America; Location: Central America	Spanish Empire: New Spain; (Spain) Captaincy General of Guatemala	Talamanca Teribe Cabécare	Victory	
Huilliche rebellion (1712) Location: South America	(Spain) Spanish Empire: (Spain) Peru; (Spain) Chiloé	Huilliches of Chiloé	Victory: Key encomenderos killed; Suppression of the rebellion; Encomienda mildened	
Tzeltal Rebellion of 1712 (1712–1713): Part of Mexican Indian Wars and Indigenous rebellion on Mexico and Central America; Location: Central America	Spanish Empire: New Spain; (Spain) Guatemala	Maya communities	Victory	
Seventh Ottoman–Venetian War (1714–18) Location: Peloponnese, Aegean Sea, Ionian Islands, Dalmatia	Republic of Venice (Habsburg monarchy) Austria (from 1716); Portugal; Order of Malta; Papal States; Spain; Himariotes	Ottoman Empire	Defeat: Treaty of Passarowitz; Morea ceded back to Ottoman Empire	
Spanish-French anti-piracy expedition in the Pacific (1716–28) Location: South Pacific (Cape Horn to Panama)	(Spain) Spanish Empire: (Spain) Viceroyalty of Peru; Kingdom of France (until 1720)	Pirates from England, Netherlands and France	Victory of the Armada del Mar del Sur.	
Basque rebellion of 1718 Location: Basque Country	(Spain) Spanish Empire	Basques Supported by: Kingdom of France	Defeat of the Spanish state: Royal decree of August 21, 1717 is abolished.; It negotiated new customs and taxes according to the Fueros of the Basque señoríos, leading to the Capitulation of 1727.	
War of the Quadruple Alliance (1718–20): Spanish conquest of Sardinia; Battle of Cape Passaro; Battle of Milazzo; Capture of Eilean Donan Castle; Battle of Glen Shiel; Battle of Francavilla; Capture of Pensacola; Capture of Vigo; Battle of Cape St. Vincent; Battle of Nassau; Villasur expedition; Location: Western Europe, Americas	Spain: New Spain; (Spain) Spanish Florida; (Spain) Spanish Texas; Jacobites	Great Britain: (British Empire) British West Indies; France: New France; Holy Roman Empire: Austria; Viceroyalty of Naples; Viceroyalty of Sardignia; Dutch Republic; Savoy: Viceroyalty of Sicily	Defeat: Treaty of The Hague: Spain renounces claims to its former Italian possessions.; Savoy and Austria swap Sicily for Habsburgs and Sardinia for Savoy.	4,350 killed or wounded
Pontcallec conspiracy (1718): Part of Cellamare conspiracy and War of the Quadruple AllianceLocation: Brittany	Estates of Brittany's rebels Spain	France	Defeat and death of Clément-Chrysogone de Guer.	
Jacobite rising of 1719: Part of Jacobite risings and War of the Quadruple Alliance; Location: Scotland	Jacobites Spain	Great Britain; Dutch Republic	Defeat	
Revolt of the Comuneros (Paraguay) (1721–25/1730–35) Location: South America (Paraguay)	(Spain) Spanish Empire: (Spain) Peru; (Spain) Río de la Plata; (Spain) Paraguay; Jesuit Province	Paraguayan comunero rebels	Victory: Paraguayans lose their right to vote for their Cabildo.	
Mapuche uprising of 1723: Part of Arauco War; Location: South America (Araucanía, Chile)	(Spain) Spanish Empire: (Spain) Peru	Mapuche rebels	Victory: Parliament of Negrete (1726)	
Anglo-Spanish War (1727–29): Blockade of Porto Bello; Siege of Gibraltar; Action of 11 March 1727; English Channel Campaign; Location: Atlantic Ocean (Caribbean, Mediterranean Sea, English Channel)	Spain	Great Britain	Indecisive: Treaty of Seville (1729)	(Note: 20,000 killed (both sides))
Spanish-Algerian War (1732) Location: North Africa (Algeria)	Spain	Ottoman Empire: Regency of Algiers; Beylik of Oran	Victory: Spanish reconquest of Oran; Spanish reconquest of Mers-el-Kébir	30 dead
Swedish invasion of the Esequibo (1732–37) Location: South America, Esequibo	(Spain) Spanish Empire: (Spain) Captaincy General of Venezuela	(yes) Swedish Empire	Victory: Swedes are expelled by Carlos Francisco Francois Sucre y Pardo (grandfather of Venezuelan independence leader Antonio José de Sucre).	
War of the Polish Succession (1733–38): Bourbon conquest of Two Sicilies; Battle of Bitonto; Siege of Gaeta; Siege of Capua; Location: Italian Peninsula, Rhineland, Poland-Lithuania	Poland loyal to Stanisław I France; Spain; Sardinia; Duchy of Parma	Poland loyal to Augustus III; Russian Empire; Habsburg Empire of Austria; Saxony Kingdom of Prussia	Victory: Treaty of Vienna; Augustus III ascends the throne of Polish–Lithuanian Commonwealth; Bourbon territorial gains. Both Naples and Sicily were conquered by the Spanish Bourbons. France guaranteed Lorraine following death of Stanisław Leszczyński.; The Spanish infant, Charles VII of Sicily, founds the House of Bourbon-Two Sicilies.	3,000 killed or wounded
Rebellion of the Pericúes (1734) Location: Mexico	Spanish Empire: New Spain; Spanish missions in Baja California; Indian auxiliaries	Pericúes Cochimíes	Defeat: Spaniards retreat from the region until 1737, then establish Presidios.	
Neapolitan–Papal War (1735–1738) Location: Central Italy	Kingdom of Naples (Spain) Spanish Empire	Papal States Supported by: Holy Roman Empire	Victory: Is formally De jure recognised the end of Feudal homage from Naples to the Papacy by Papal States and Holy Roman Emperors.	
Spanish–Portuguese War (1735–37) Location: South America, Río de la Plata Basin (Banda Oriental)	(Spain) Spanish Empire: (Spain) Peru; (Spain) Río de la Plata	(Portugal) Portuguese Empire: State of Brazil	Defeat	
War of Jenkins' Ear (1739–48): Spanish Alarm; Battle of Porto Bello (1739); Siege of Fort Mose; Siege of St. Augustine (1740); George Anson's voyage around the world; Attacks on Fuerteventura in 1740; Action of 8 April 1740; Battle of Cartagena de Indias; Invasion of Cuba; Action of 14 June 1742; Invasion of Georgia; Battle of Bloody Marsh; Battle of Gully Hole Creek; Battle of La Guaira; Battle of Puerto Cabello; Battle of Toulon; Voyage of the Glorioso; Action of 18 March 1748; Battle of Santiago de Cuba; Battle of Havana; Part of War of the Austrian Succession; Location: Americas, Pacific Ocean, Atlantic Ocean (mostly Caribbean and Mediterranean Sea)	Spanish Empire: New Spain; (Spain) Cuba; (Spain) Florida; (Spain) New Granada; (Spain) Venezuela Province	Great Britain: British America	Indecisive: Status quo ante bellum; British offensive in the Caribbean theatre defeated; British invasion of Florida repulsed; Spanish invasion of Georgia repulsed; Treaty of Aix-la-Chapelle (1748) leading to Treaty of Madrid (1750); The British suffer 20,000 casualties and lose 407 ships (1739–1741)	
War of the Austrian Succession (1740–48): Italian Theater; Expedition to Naples; Battle of Campo Santo; Battle of Toulon; Battle of Villafranca; Battle of Velletri; Battle of Madonna dell'Olmo; Battle of Bassignano; Battle of Piacenza; Battle of Rottofreddo; Siege of Genoa; Location: Western Europe, Americas, Atlantic Ocean (mostly Caribbean, Mediterranean Sea and North Sea), Pacific Ocean and India	France: New France; Wabanaki Confederacy Prussia; Spain; Bavaria (1741–45); Saxony (1741–42) (Kingdom of the Two Sicilies) Sicily and Naples; Republic of Genoa (1745–48); Sweden (1741–43); Savoy-Sardinia (1741–42)	Habsburg Monarchy; Great Britain: British America; Iroquois Confederacy (Province of Hanover) Hanover; Dutch Republic; Saxony (1743–45); Savoy-Sardinia (1742–48); Russia (1741–43, 1748)	Victory: Treaty of Aix-la-Chapelle; Maria Theresa retains the Austrian throne; Prussian control of Silesia confirmed; Duchies of Parma, Piacenza and Guastalla restored to the Spanish Bourbons	3,000 killed or wounded
Juan Santos Rebellion (1742–1752) Location: Peru	(Spain) Spanish Empire: (Spain) Spanish Peru	Juan Santos Atahualpa rebel group: Asháninka; Yanesha; Shipibo; Piro; Quechua	Defeat: Spanish missionaries expelled from the Yungas of Peru	
Dagohoy rebellion (1744–1829) Location: Philippines	(Spain) Spanish Empire: (Spain) Spanish Philippines	Dagohoy rebel group: Boholano people	Victory: Pardoned 19,420 survivors and permitted them to live in new villages at the lowlands	
Great Gypsy Round-up (1749) Location: Spain	Spain	Gitanos	Defeat: The raid against Gypsi people fails to do a total Cultural genocide, most of the gitanos are released shortly after.	
Pima Revolt (1751): Part of Mexican indian war and Indigenous rebellion on Mexico and Central America; Location: North America	Spanish Empire: New Spain (Spanish Arizona)	Pima Indians	Victory	
Action of 28 November 1751 (1751) Location: North Africa	Spain	Regency of Algiers	Victory	
Guaraní War (1754–56) Location: South America, Misiones Orientales ( Paraguay-Brazil-Argentina borders)	(Spain) Spanish Empire: (Spain) Viceroyalty of Peru; (Spain) Governorate of the Río de la Plata; (Portugal) Portuguese Empire: State of Brazil	Guaraní Tribes Jesuits: Jesuit missions among the Guaraní	Spanish-Portuguese victory.: Ratification of the Exchange Treaty.; Declaration of the border between Spain and Portugal in South America; Treaty of El Pardo.; Total abandonment of the eastern missions by the Guarani (Transfer of the Guarani out of the territories ceded to Portugal.).; Subsequent Expulsion of the Jesuits from Portugal in 1759 and then of the Expulsion of the Jesuits from Spanish Empire of 1767.	
Gipuzkoa revolt of 1755: Part of Crisis of the Ancien Régime in the Southern Basque CountryLocation: Basque Country	Spain	Basques	Defeat of the Spanish government	
Mutiny of the Ceclavineros (1755) Location: Spain	Spain	Ceclavín	Defeat: Ceclavine smugglers continue with their activities	
Seven Years' War (1756–63): Spanish invasion of Portugal (1762); Location: Europe, Americas, West Africa, India, Southeast Asia.	France; Holy Roman Empire; Austria; Russia (until 1762); (Spain) Spanish Empire (from 1762); Sweden (1757–62); Saxony; Mughal Empire (from 1757)	Great Britain; Prussia; (Province of Hanover) Hanover; Brunswick-Wolfenbüttel; Iroquois Confederacy; Portugal (from 1762); Hesse-Kassel; Schaumburg-Lippe	Defeat: Treaty of Saint Petersburg (1762); Treaty of Hamburg (1762); Treaty of Paris (1763); Treaty of Hubertusburg (1763); Status quo ante bellum in Europe; Transfer of colonial possessions between Great Britain, France, and Spain after French-Indian war.	3,000 killed or wounded
Cisteil Rebellion (1761) Location: Mesoamerica	Spanish Empire: New Spain; (Spain) Captaincy General of Yucatán	Maya peoples	Victory	
Anglo-Spanish War (1762–63): Battle for the Río San Juan de Nicaragua; Battle of Havana; Action of 31 May 1762; Spanish invasion of Portugal; Battle of Valencia de Alcántara; Battle of Manila; Battle of Vila Velha; Action of 30 October 1762; Battle of Marvão; Location: Iberian Peninsula, North America (Florida and French Louisiana), Central America, South America (Río de la Plata), Caribbean (Cuba), East Indies (Philippines)	Spanish Empire: New Spain; (Spain) Viceroyalty of Peru; France: (Kingdom of France) French West Indies; New France; Abenaki nation	Great Britain: (British Empire) British America; Iroquois Confederacy; Portugal; Filipino rebels	Defeat: Spain cedes Florida to Britain in exchange for return of Havana.; Spain received Louisiana from France.	
Silang Revolt (1762–1763): Guagua Revolt; Part of Seven Years' War and British occupation of Manila; Location: Philippines	(Spain) Spanish Empire: (Spain) Filipino loyalist	Diego Silang and Gabriela Silang rebel forces Supported by: Great Britain; Chinese rebels	Victory	
Fantastic War (1762–63): First Cevallos expedition; Mojeño War; Anglo-Portuguese invasion of the Río de la Plata (1763); Location: Iberian Peninsula and South America (Río de la Plata and Amazon Forest)	Spain: (Spain) Peru; (Spain) New Granada; France	(Portugal) Portuguese Empire: State of Brazil; Great Britain	Stalemate: Spanish victory on River Plate. In present-day Uruguay, Spanish captured Colónia do Sacramento and advanced into Rio Grande do Sul.; The thesis of the Portuguese Empire prevailed that the Guaporé river should serve as a border between the two Empires in the Amazon Jungle on present-day Bolivia.; The Portuguese conquered most of the valley of Rio Negro, expelling the Spaniards from S. Gabriel and S. josé de Maribatanas.	
Quito Revolt of 1765 Location: South America (modern Ecuador)	Spain: (Spain) Viceroyalty of New Granada	Quito rebels	Victory	
Esquilache Riots (1766) Location: Spain	Spain	Madrid revolters	Compromise: The King accept popular demands	
Real del Monte riots (1766) Location: Mexico	Spain: New Spain	Real del Monte protesters	Compromise: The King accept popular demands	
Gipuzkoa revolt of 1766: Part of Crisis of the Ancien Régime in the Southern Basque Country; Location: Basque Country	Spain: Basque señoríos	Basques	Victory of the Spanish government: Physiocracy is imposed against Basque Fueros.	
Mapuche uprising of 1766 (1766): Part of Arauco War; Location: Chile	(Spain) Spanish Empire: (Spain) Viceroyalty of Peru; (Spain) Captaincy General of Chile; Mapuche allies Pehuenche	Mapuche rebels	Defeat	
Louisiana Rebellion (1768) Location: North America	Spanish Empire: New Spain; (Spain) Louisiana	Louisiana Creole people	Victory	
Manila conflict (1769): Part of North Borneo dispute; Location: Southeast Asia	Sultanate of Sulu (Spain) Spanish Empire: (Spain) Spanish East Indies	Bruneian empire	Defeat: Bruneian occupation of Manila	
Guajira Rebellion (1769–1776) Location: Venezuela	(Spain) Spanish Empire: (Spain) Captaincy General of Venezuela	Guajiros Taironas Caribes	Indecisive	
Communera Revolution of Paraguay (1770) Location: South America, Paraguay	(Spain) Spanish Empire: (Spain) Viceroyalty of Peru; (Spain) Río de la Plata	Paraguayan comunero rebels	Victory	
Capture of Port Egmont (1770) Location: Atlantic Ocean, Falkland Islands	Spanish Empire: Río de la Plata	Great Britain	Victory: Start of Falklands Crisis of 1770.	
Spanish expeditions to Tahiti (1772–75 ) Location: Pacific Ocean, Polynesia	(Spain) Spanish Empire: (Spain) Viceroyalty of Peru; Allied Christianized Tahitians	Pagan Tahitians Spanish and Peruvian mutineers	Victory, but withdrawal due to anti-clerical policies of Charles III and economical problems in Peru to support the stability of the catholic missions.	
Mutiny of the Barcelona quintas (1773) Location: Spain, Catalonia	Spain: Captain General of Catalonia	Diputación de Cataluña	Stalemate: Victory of the Absolutist monarchy and failure to restore the Fueros of the Generalitat and Catalan constitutions; Partial victory of the rebels in the deposition of the captain general and to avoid the quintas in Barcelona	
Siege of Melilla (1774) Location: North Africa	Spain	Morocco; Supported by: Great Britain	Victory	600
Spanish expeditions against Algiers (1775, 1783, 1784): Bombardment of Algiers (1783); Bombardment of Algiers (1784); Location: North Africa (Algeria)	Spain; Kingdom of Naples; Tuscany; Hospitaller Malta; Two Sicilies; Portugal	Regency of Algiers	Defeat: Signed a definitive Peace Treaty with the Ottoman Empire in 1782.	528 dead (1775) (Note: Spanish: 528 killed, 2,279 wounded; Algerian: 1,200 cavalry killed); 26 dead (1783); 53 dead (1784)
Spanish–Portuguese War (1776–77): Second Ceballos Expedition; Location: South America, Río de la Plata Basin	(Spain) Spanish Empire: (Spain) Viceroyalty of the Río de la Plata	(Portugal) Portuguese Empire: Brazilian colonial forces	Victory: First Treaty of San Ildefonso; Portugal remains neutral during the American Revolutionary War	
Spanish expedition to Fernando Poo and Annobón (1778–80); Location: Africa, Gulf of Guinea	(Spain) Spanish Empire: (Spain) Viceroyalty of the Río de la Plata	Bubi people loyal to Portuguese rule Spanish mutineers of Jerónimo Martín Great Britain	Defeat: The rebels apprehend the highest authority (Lieutenant Colonel Primo de Rivera), passing command to the second in command, Sergeant Martín. The new chief evacuated the colony, directing the survivors to São Tomé, where he was captured by the Portuguese who restored the Ten. Cor. Primo de Rivera in his position.; The Spanish city of Concepción is razed by the native Africans.; Due to the adversity of the climate, the tropical diseases that decimated the soldiers, the hostility of the nearby British fleet and the fear of an attack by the Bubi population. The Spanish leave the colony after taking possession in the name of Carlos III of Spain of the Territories of the Gulf of Guinea.; Later British occupation of Fernando Poo since 1827 to 1843	
American Revolutionary War (1775–1782): Spain and the American Revolutionary War; Western theater of the American Revolutionary War; Southern theater of the American Revolutionary War; Gulf Coast campaign; Naval battles of the American Revolutionary War; Anglo-French War (1778–1783); Location: North America, Central America, Atlantic Ocean	United States Spain (since 1779): New Spain; (Spain) Louisiana; France (since 1778): Canadian Auxiliaries; Iroquois: Oneida; Tuscarora; Watauga Association Catawba Lenape Choctaw Dutch Republic Mysore	Great Britain: Loyalists of Thirteen Colonies; British Canada; Iroquois: Onondaga; Cayuga; Seneca; Cherokee German Auxiliaries	Victory: Treaty of Paris (1783); Britain recognizes the independence of the United States of America and the Thirteen Colonies.	
Anglo-Spanish War (1779–83): Part of the American Revolutionary War; Europe & Atlantic: Armada of 1779; Great Siege of Gibraltar; Action of 14 September 1779; Action of 11 November 1779; Action of 20 November 1779; Action of 8 January 1780; Battle of Cape St. Vincent (1780); Action of 9 August 1780; Action of 25 February 1781; Action of 1 May 1781; Invasion of Minorca (1781); Action of 16 March 1782; Battle of Cape Spartel; Louisiana and the Gulf Coast: Spanish conquest of West Florida; Battle of St. Louis; Siege of Pensacola; Battle of Arkansas Post; Central America: Capture of Río Hondo; Capture of Cayo Cocina; Battle of San Fernando de Omoa; Action of 12 December 1779; San Juan Expedition (1780); Battle of Roatán; Battle of the Black River; West Indies: Action of 15 January 1782; Capture of the Bahamas (1782); Action of 17 February 1783; Capture of the Bahamas (1783)	Spain: New Spain; (Spain) Captaincy General of Guatemala; (Spain) Captaincy General of Cuba; (Spain) Captaincy General of Santo Domingo; (Spain) Captaincy General of Puerto Rico; (Spain) Viceroyalty of New Granada	Great Britain: (British Empire) British West Indies	Victory: Peace of Paris; East Florida, West Florida, the Mosquito Coast, Campeche, the San Andrés archipelago and Menorca recovered by Spain; The Bahamas, the island of Grenada, and Montserrat captured by Spain but returned to Britain.; Spanish empire achieves its maximum territorial expansion.	5,000 killed or died of disease
Rebellion of Túpac Amaru II (1780–83): Oruro Rebellion; Part of Protests and rebellions of the eighteenth century in the Viceroyalty of Peru; Location: South America, Andes (Modern Peru and Bolivia)	Spain: (Spain) Viceroyalty of Peru; (Spain) Peruvian Royalists; (Spain) Viceroyalty of the Río de la Plata; (Spain) Real Audiencia of Charcas	Túpac Amaru II forces: Aymara and Quechua rebels; (Spain) Spanish rebels, mostly peasants, including creoles, mestizos and blacks	Victory	(Note: 100,000 Indians and 10,000–40,000 non-Indians)
Revolt of the Comuneros (New Granada) (1781) Location: South America, Colombia	(Spain) Spanish Empire: (Spain) Viceroyalty of New Granada	Comunero rebels of New Granada	Victory	
Insurrection of the comuneros of Venezuela (1781) Location: South America, Venezuela	(Spain) Spanish Empire: (Spain) Viceroyalty of New Granada	Comunero rebels of Captaincy General of Venezuela	Victory	
Cherokee–American wars [2nd phase post-revolution] (1783–1795): Part of American Indian Wars; Location: North America (United States, Old Southwest)	Spanish Empire: New Spain; (Spain) Louisiana; Cherokee Co-belligerent: Northwestern Confederacy	United States	Spanish withdrawal due to Coalition Wars. Defeat of Cherokees: Treaty of Tellico	
Nootka Crisis (1789–1790): Part of Spanish expeditions to the Pacific Northwest and Russo-Spanish Rivalry in the Pacific; Location: North America, Nootka Sound (modern Canada)	Spanish Empire: New Spain	Great Britain: (British Empire) British North America (The Canadas); Nuu-chah-nulth people Russian Empire: Russian Alaska; United States	Defeat: Nootka Convention	
Hispano-Moroccan War (1790–1791): Siege of Ceuta (1790–1791); Bombardment of Tangier (1791); Location: North Africa	Spain	Sultanate of Morocco	Victory	
Haitian Revolution (1791–1804): Battle of Saint-Raphaël; Battle of Gonaïves; Part of French Revolutionary Wars; Location: Caribbean, Hispaniola	1791–1793; Ex-slaves; French royalists (Spain) Spanish Empire (from 1793): (Spain) Captaincy General of Santo Domingo; 1793–1798; French royalists Great Britain (Spain) Spanish Empire (until 1795): (Spain) Captaincy General of Santo Domingo; 1798–1801 (France) Louverture Loyalists; 1802–1804; Ex-slaves; United Kingdom	1791–1793; Slave owners Kingdom of France (until 1792); French Republic; 1793–1798; French Republic: Ex-slaves; 1798–1801 (France) Rigaud Loyalists (France) French Republic: Polish Legions	Defeat	
Huilliche uprising of 1792 Location: Chile	(Spain) Spanish Empire: (Spain) Governorate of Chiloé	Huilliche people of Futahuillimapu	Victory: Parliament of Las Canoas	
Algerian conquest of Oran (1792) Location: North Africa (Algeria)	(Spain) Spanish Empire: (Spain) Spanish Oran	Regency of Algiers	Defeat: Spain cedes Oran to Algiers in exchange of economical privileges.	
War of the First Coalition (1792–97): Mediterranean campaign of 1793–1796; Part of French Revolutionary Wars and French Revolution; Location: Europe, Mediterranean Sea	Kingdom of France (until 1792); French First Republic (from 1792); Spain (from 1796); Batavian Republic (from 1795); (Kingdom of Italy (Napoleonic)) Sister republic Polish Legions (from 1797)	First Coalition: Holy Roman Empire: Habsburg monarchy; Prussia (until 1795); Great Britain (Kingdom of France) Army of Condé; Spain (until 1795); Dutch Republic (until 1795); Portugal; Sardinia (until 1796); Naples; Other Italian states	Victory: Peace of Basel, Treaty of Campo Formio; Establishment and survival of the French First Republic; French annexation of the Austrian Netherlands, the Left Bank of the Rhine and other smaller territories; Several French "sister republics" established; Hostilities resume in 1798 with the formation of a Second Coalition against France	
War of the Pyrenees (1793–95): Battle of Mas Deu; Capture of San Pietro and Sant'Antioco; Siege of Bellegarde; Battle of Perpignan; Battle of Peyrestortes; Battle of Truillas; Battle of Collioure; Capture of Fort-Dauphin; Battle of Sans Culotte Camp; Battle of Boulou; Siege of Collioure; Battle of the Baztan Valley; Battle of San Lorenzo de la Muga; Battle of Orbaitzeta; Battle of the Black Mountain; Siege of Roses; Action of 14 February 1795; Battle of Bascara; Part of French Revolutionary Wars; Location: Pyrenees, Hispaniola	Spain: (Spain) Santo Domingo; Portugal (Kingdom of France) French Émigrés	France: (France) Saint-Domingue	Defeat: Peace of Basel; The Spanish give up the colony of Santo Domingo in exchange for recovering the lost peninsular territories; Second Treaty of San Ildefonso	
French expedition to Sardinia (1792–1793): Part of French Revolutionary Wars; Location: Mediterranean Sea, Sardinia	(Kingdom of Sardinia) Sardinia Spain (since 1793)	France	Spanish-Sardinian victory	
Federalist revolts (1793): Siege of Toulon (1793); Part of French Revolution and French Revolutionary Wars; Location: France	(France) Fédéralistes French Royalists: Vendeans; Chouans; Great Britain; Kingdom of Spain; Kingdom of Naples; Kingdom of Sicily; Kingdom of Sardinia	France: Convention montagnarde	Defeat	
East Indies theatre of the French Revolutionary Wars (1793–1801): Raid on Manila; Macau Incident (1799); Part of French Revolutionary Wars; Location: Asia–Pacific	(France) French Republic: French India; (Spain) Spanish Empire: (Spain) Spanish East Indies; Batavian Republic: Dutch East Indies	Great Britain: British East India Company; Portugal Coalition forces	Defeat	
Insurrection of Negros de Coro (1795) Location: Venezuela	(Spain) Spanish Empire: (Spain) Captaincy General of Venezuela	Slaves and Maroons	Victory	
1796 Boca de Nigua slave revolt Location: Hispaniola	(Spain) Spanish Empire: (Spain) Captaincy General of Santo Domingo	Slaves	Victory	
Anglo-Spanish War (1796–1808): Part of French Revolutionary Wars; Atlantic: Action of 25 January 1797; Battle of Cape St Vincent; Action of 26 April 1797; Assault on Cádiz; Battle of Santa Cruz de Tenerife; Action of 16 October 1799; Action of 6–7 April 1800; Ferrol Expedition; Action of 5 October 1804; Action of 25 November 1804; Action of 7 December 1804; Battle of Cape Finisterre; Battle of Trafalgar; Action of 4 April 1808; Mediterranean: Action of 13 October 1796; Action of 19 December 1796; Capture of Minorca; Action of 15 July 1798; Action of 19 January 1799; Action of 6 February 1799; Action of 7 July 1799; Action of 10 December 1800; Action of 6 May 1801; Algeciras campaign; Americas: Newfoundland expedition; Invasion of Trinidad; Battle of San Juan; Battle of St. George's Caye; Cutting out of the Hermione; Battle of Diamond Rock; British invasions of the Río de la Plata; Action of 23 August 1806	Spain: (Spain) Viceroyalty of the Río de la Plata; (Spain) Viceroyalty of New Granada; (Spain) Captaincy General of Venezuela; Viceroyalty of New Spain; (Spain) Captaincy General of Santo Domingo; (Spain) Captaincy General of Puerto Rico; France	Great Britain: British America; British Honduras; Cape Colony	Inconclusive: Treaty of Amiens (1802); Belligerence resumed in May 1804; Cessation of hostilities and de facto Anglo-Spanish alliance upon outbreak of the Peninsular War (1808); Trinidad ceded to Britain (1802); Menorca returned to Spain (1802)	7,000 killed or wounded (1796–1802)
Gual and España conspiracy (1797) Location: Venezuela	(Spain) Spanish Empire: (Spain) Captaincy General of Venezuela	Independentists	Victory	
War of the Second Coalition (1798–1802): Mediterranean campaign of 1798; Algeciras campaign; Part of French Revolutionary Wars; Location: Europe, Atlantic Ocean (Mediterranean Sea, Caribbean), Middle East	France; Spain; Polish Legions; Denmark–Norway; French client republics: Batavian Republic; Helvetic Republic; (Kingdom of Italy (Napoleonic)) Cisalpine Republic; (Kingdom of Italy (Napoleonic)) Roman Republic (until 1799); (Kingdom of Italy (Napoleonic)) Parthenopaean Republic (1799)	Second Coalition: Holy Roman Empire: (Habsburg monarchy) Austria; Great Britain (until 1801); United Kingdom (from 1801); Russia (until 1801): Septinsular Republic; Portugal; Naples: Sanfedismo; Grand Duchy of Tuscany (Sovereign Military Order of Malta) Order of Saint John (1798); Malta (1798–1800); Ottoman Empire (Kingdom of France) French Royalists United States (Quasi-War) (until 1800)	Victory: Treaty of Lunéville, Treaty of Amiens; Survival of the French Republic; Previous annexations by France confirmed; Hostilities resume in 1803 between France and Great Britain; Third Coalition later formed against France	
Russo-Spanish War (1799–1801): Part of French Revolutionary Wars; Location: North Pacific Ocean and Mediterranean Sea	Spain	Russia	Inconclusive: Treaty of Paris (1801)	0
Battle of Puerto Plata Harbor (1800): Part of Quasi-WarLocation: Hispaniola	France: (France) Saint-Domingue; Spain: (Spain) Santo Domingo	United States	Defeat	
War of the Oranges (1801): Portuguese conquest of the Eastern Missions; Part of French Revolutionary Wars; Location: Iberian Peninsula (mostly Portugal) and South America (mostly Brazil and Río de la Plata)	France: (France) French Guiana; Spain: (Spain) Viceroyalty of the Río de la Plata	Portugal: State of Brazil	Victory: Treaty of Badajoz; Question of Olivença; Portuguese territory returned, except Olivenza, and border territories, which remained in Spanish possession; France territorial guarantees in Trinidad, Port Mahon (Menorca) and Malta, as well as lands north of Brazil	
War of the Third Coalition (1803–06): Trafalgar campaign; Part of Napoleonic Wars; Location: Europe, Mediterranean Sea and West Indies	(France) French Empire: (Kingdom of Italy (Napoleonic)) Etruria; Batavian Republic; Napoleonic Italy; Spain; Electorate of Bavaria; Württemberg	Third Coalition: Holy Roman Empire; Russian Empire; United Kingdom; Kingdom of Naples (Kingdom of the Two Sicilies) Kingdom of Sicily; Sweden (Kingdom of France) French counter-revolutionaries (Kingdom of France) French royalists	Victory: Treaty of Pressburg; Dissolution of the Holy Roman Empire; Creation of the Confederation of the Rhine; Hostilities resume few months later with the formation of a Fourth Coalition against France	
Caribbean campaign of 1803–1810: Battle of Diamond Rock; Battle of Palo Hincado; Spanish reconquest of Santo Domingo; Part of Napoleonic Wars; Location: Caribbean	United Kingdom: British America; Portugal: State of Brazil; Spain (since 1808): (Spain) Santo Domingo; (Spain) Cuba; (Spain) Puerto Rico	(France) French Empire: (France) French Antilles; Spain (until 1808): (Spain) Santo Domingo; (Spain) Cuba; (Spain) Puerto Rico; Batavian Republic: (Netherlands) Dutch West Indies; Denmark–Norway (since 1808): (Denmark) Danish West Indies	Coalition Victory: West Indies were in total control of British and Spanish naval forces.	
Zamakolada (1804–1807) Location: Basque Country	Spain: Lordship of Biscay	Basques	Military victory: Occupation of Biscay by the Spanish Army, centralising administration of the region against Fuero.Political Compromise: Abolition of the project for a new port on Biscay, in benefice of Bilbao monopoly.; Abolition of project of conscription for Basques to serve on Napoleonic Wars.	
Franco-Swedish War (1805–10): Siege of Stralsund (1807); Part of Napoleonic Wars; Location: Northern Europe	(France) French Empire (Netherlands) Holland Denmark–Norway (1808–1809) Spain (until 1808): Division of the North; Russian Empire (since 1808)	Sweden: Swedish Pomerania; United Kingdom Prussia Austria Saxony Russian Empire (until 1807)	Spanish retreat of the conflict due to Peninsular War.: Evacuation of La Romana's division; French victory: Treaty of Paris (1810)	
War of the Fourth Coalition (1806–07): Part of Napoleonic Wars; Location: Europe	French Empire: (Spain) Spanish Empire; (Kingdom of Italy (Napoleonic)) Etruria; Confederation of the Rhine; (Kingdom of Bavaria) Bavaria; Württemberg; Saxony (after 11 December 1806); (Kingdom of Italy (Napoleonic)) Italy; (Kingdom of Naples) Naples; (Netherlands) Holland; Switzerland; Polish Legions	Fourth Coalition: Prussia; Russian Empire; United Kingdom; Saxony (until 11 December 1806); Sweden; Sicily	Victory: Treaties of Tilsit; Prussia loses half of its territory; Creation of the Duchy of Warsaw; Saxony joins the Confederation of the Rhine; Franco-Russian alliance; Creation of the Continental System; Hostilities resume later in 1807 with the commencement of the Peninsular War and expanded in 1809 with the formation of a Fifth Coalition against France	
British invasions of the River Plate (1806–1807): 1st Battle of Buenos Aires; Battle of Perdriel; Battle of Cardal; Battle of Montevideo (1807); Battle of Colonia del Sacramento (1807); Action of 2 June 1807; Battle of San Pedro (1807); Battle of Miserere; 2nd Battle of Buenos Aires; Part of Anglo-Spanish War (1796–1808) and Napoleonic Wars; Location: Río de la Plata Basin (Modern Argentina and Uruguay)	Spain: (Spain) Viceroyalty of the Río de la Plata; (Spain) Buenos Aires Intendency; (Spain) Montevideo Government	United Kingdom: Cape Colony	Spanish-Rioplatense Victory	
Invasion of Portugal (1807): Part of Napoleonic Wars; Location: Iberian Peninsula	(France) French Empire; Spain	Portugal	Victory: Franco-Spanish occupation of Portugal; Transfer of the Portuguese court to Brazil; Start of French occupation of Spain	
English Wars (Scandinavia) (1807–1814): Part of Napoleonic Wars and Gunboat War; Location: Northern Europe	Denmark–Norway Supported by: (France) French Empire; Spain (until 1808)	United Kingdom Supported by: Sweden	Spanish retreat of the conflict after Evacuation of La Romana's division. Start of "Huéscar-Danish War". Anglo-Swedish Victory	
Tumult of Aranjuez (1808) Location: Spain	(Spain) Spanish Government (Manuel Godoy)	(Spain) Rebels led by Ferdinand VII	Defeat: Fall of Godoy and abdication of Charles IV of Spain.; French intervention on Spain.	
Peninsular War (1808–14): Part of Napoleonic Wars; Battle of Évora; Dos de Mayo Uprising; Combat of El Bruch; Battle of Alcolea Bridge; Battle of Cabezón; Battle of Gerona; Evacuation of the La Romana Division; First siege of Zaragoza; Second siege of Gerona; Battle of Medina de Rioseco; Battle of Valencia; Capture of the Rosily Squadron; Battle of Bailén; Battle of Valmaseda; Battle of Burgos; Siege of Roses; Battle of Espinosa de los Monteros; Battle of Tudela; Battle of Somosierra; Battle of Cardadeu; Battle of Molins de Rey; Second Siege of Zaragoza; Battle of Castellón; Battle of Mansilla; Battle of Villafranca; Battle of Puente Sanpayo; Battle of Uclés; Battle of Miajadas; Battle of Los Yébenes; Battle of Ciudad Real; Battle of Medellín; Battle of Talavera; Battle of Arzobispo; Battle of Almonacid; Battle of Puerto de Baños; Battle of Tamames; Battle of Ocaña; Battle of Carpio; Battle of Alba de Tormes; Siege of Cádiz; Battle of Valls; Third Siege of Gerona; Battle of Alcañiz; Battle of María; Battle of Belchite; Battle of Mollet; Battle of Vich; Battle of Manresa; Siege of Lérida; Siege of Mequinenza; Battle of La Bisbal; Siege of Tortosa; Battle of Pla; Siege of Tarragona (1811); Battle of Montserrat; Siege of Figueras; Battle of Cervera; Battle of Saguntum; Siege of Valencia; Battle of Altafulla; Battle of Castalla (1812); Battle of Castalla; Siege of Tarragona (1813); Siege of Astorga; Siege of Ciudad Rodrigo; Siege of Cádiz; Battle of Fuengirola; Battle of Baza; Battle of Barrosa; Battle of Zújar; Battle of Bornos (1811); Battle of Bornos (1812); Battle of the Gebora; Battle of Albuera; Battle of Usagre; Battle of Arlabán (1811); Battle of Cogorderos; Battle of Arroyo dos Molinos; Siege of Tarifa; Battle of Arlabán (1812); Battle of Salamanca; Siege of Burgos; Battle of Tordesillas; Battle of San Millan-Osma; Battle of Vitoria; Battle of Tolosa; Battle of the Pyrenees; Battle of Sorauren; Battle of San Marcial; Battle of the Bidassoa; Siege of Pamplona; Battle of Nivelle; Battle of the Nive; Battle of Garris; Battle of Toulouse; Battle of Bayonne; Location: Iberian Peninsula, Southern France	Bourbon Spain: Cortes of Cádiz; United Kingdom; Portugal	(France) French Empire; Bonapartist Spain: Afrancesado; (Poland) Duchy of Warsaw (Kingdom of Italy (Napoleonic)) Italy (Kingdom of Naples) Naples (Netherlands) Holland Confederation of the Rhine Swiss Confederation	Victory: Treaty of Valençay; Treaty of Paris	300,000 military deaths 200,000 civilian deaths
Spanish American revolts against Bonapartist rule (1808–10): Part of Napoleonic WarsLocation: Latin America	(Spain) Supreme Central Junta: (Spain) Spanish American Royalists; Supported by: United Kingdom of Portugal, Brazil and the Algarves Spanish American Juntas Supported by: United Kingdom	Spain under Joseph Bonaparte Supported by: (France) French Empire	Pyrrhic victory: Start of Spanish American wars of independence.	
Conjuration of the Mantuanos (1808) Location: Venezuela	(Spain) Supreme Central Junta: (Spain) Captaincy General of Venezuela	Mantuanos (autonomists or separatist) Supported by: United Kingdom Bonapartists	Victory	
Spanish reconquest of Santo Domingo (1808–09): Battle of Palo Hincado; Part of Napoleonic Wars; Location: Caribbean, Hispaniola	Spain; United Kingdom	(France) French Empire	Victory	
War of the Fifth Coalition (1809): Part of Napoleonic Wars; Location: Europe, Atlantic Ocean	Fifth Coalition: Austria; Hungary; Tyrol; United Kingdom; Spain; (Kingdom of the Two Sicilies) Sicily; Sardinia; Black Brunswickers	France: Confederation of the Rhine; Bavaria; Saxony; Württemberg; Westphalia; Italy; (Poland) Duchy of Warsaw; Naples; Switzerland; (Netherlands) Holland	Defeat: Treaty of Schönbrunn; Franco-Austrian Alliance; Napoleon marries Marie Louise of Austria; Hostilities in the Peninsular War maintained; General hostilities across Europe resume in 1812 with the French Invasion of Russia and expand in 1813 with the formation of a Sixth Coalition against France	
Bolivian War of Independence (1809–25): Battle of Cotagaita; Battle of Suipacha; Battle of Huaqui; Battle of Pequereque; Battle of Vilcapugio; Action of Tambo Nuevo; Battle of Ayohuma; Battle of Sipe-Sipe; Battle of la Tablada de Tolomosa; Part of Spanish American wars of independence; Location: South America (Bolivia, Southern Peru, Argentine Northwest)	Spain: (Spain) Viceroyalty of the Río de la Plata; (Spain) Real Audiencia of Charcas; (Spain) Viceroyalty of Peru; (Spain) Peruvian Royalists; Royalists	United Provinces of the River Plate; Republiquetas Republic of Peru (since 1821) Gran Colombia (since 1824)	Defeat: Independence of Bolivia and instauration of Criollo nationalism.	
Ecuadorian War of Independence (1809–22): Part of Spanish American wars of independence; Location: South America (Ecuador)	Spain: (Spain) Viceroyalty of New Granada; (Spain) Real Audiencia of Quito; (Spain) Viceroyalty of Peru; (Spain) Governorate of Guayaquil; (Spain) Peruvian Royalists; Royalists	Independentist Armies: Government Junta of Quito; Free Province of Guayaquil; Gran Colombia Republic of Peru	Defeat: Independence of Ecuador from Spain	
Mexican War of Independence (1810–21): Battle of Monte de las Cruces; Battle of Calderón Bridge; Battle of Puerto de Piñones; Battle of Zacatecas; Battle of El Veladero; Battle of El Maguey; Battle of Llanos de Santa Juana; Battle of Zitácuaro; Battle of Tecualoya; Battle of Tenancingo; Siege of Cuautla; Battle of Izúcar; Siege of Huajuapan de León; Battle of Tenango del Valle; Battle of Escamela; Battle of Zitlala; Capture of Orizaba; Capture of Oaxaca; Battle of Rosillo Creek; Siege of Acapulco; Battle of La Chincúa; Battle of Alazan Creek; Battle of Medina; Battle of Lomas de Santa María; Battle of Puruarán; Battle of Temalaca; Battle of Azcapotzalco; Part of Spanish American wars of independence; Location: North America (Mexico) and Central America	Spain: New Spain; (Spain) Mexican royalists	Insurgents; Army of the Three Guarantees (1821)	Defeat: First Mexican Empire gains independence from Spain	
Argentine War of Independence (1810–18): Battle of Campichuelo; Battle of Paraguarí; Battle of San Nicolás; Battle of Tacuarí; Battle of Tucumán; Siege of Montevideo; Battle of Cerrito; Battle of San Lorenzo; Battle of Salta; Battle of Martín García; Battle of Buceo; Battle of Yavi; Crossing of the Andes; Part of Spanish American wars of independence; Location: South America (Argentina, Uruguay, Paraguay, Bolivia and Chile)	Royalists (Spain) Viceroyalty of the Río de la Plata (Spain) Viceroyalty of Peru: (Spain) Peruvian Royalists	Patriots; United Provinces of the River Plate; Chilean exiles Supported by: United Kingdom	Defeat: Argentine victory and emancipation from Spanish colonial rule; Slavery partially abolished	
Chilean War of Independence (1810–26): Battle of Yerbas Buenas; Battle of San Carlos; Siege of Chillán; Battle of El Roble; First Battle of Talca; Battle of El Quilo; Battle of Membrillar; First Battle of Cancha Rayada; Battle of Quechereguas; Battle of Las Tres Acequias; Battle of Rancagua; Battle of Chacabuco; Battle of Curapalihue; Second Battle of Cancha Rayada; Battle of Maipú; Battle of Píleo; Battle of Tarpellanca; Capture of Valdivia; Battle of Agüi; Battle of El Toro; Part of Spanish American wars of independence; Location: South America (Chile and Neuquén Basin, Argentina), South Pacific	(Spain) Spanish Empire: (Spain) Viceroyalty of Peru; (Spain) Captaincy General of Chile; (Spain) Governorate of Chiloé; (Spain) Chilean and Chilota royalists; (Spain) Peruvian Royalists; Mapuche allies	Chile (Argentina) United Provinces; Mapuche allies Supported by: United Kingdom	Defeat: Chilean emancipation from Spanish colonial rule	
US Occupation of West Florida (1810) Location: West Florida	Kingdom of Spain: (Spain) Spanish Florida	United States	Stalemate	
Portuguese invasion of the Banda Oriental (1811–1812): Part of Napoleonic Wars and Spanish American wars of independence; Location: South America, Banda Oriental (Uruguay)	Kingdom of Spain: (Spain) Viceroyalty of the Río de la Plata	United Kingdom of Portugal, Brazil and the Algarves (Argentina) United Provinces	Inconclusive	
Venezuelan War of Independence (1811–23): Part of Spanish American wars of independence; Location: South America (Venezuela and Colombia), Caribbean Sea	Kingdom of Spain: (Spain) Viceroyalty of New Granada; (Spain) Captaincy General of Venezuela	Venezuela; Gran Colombia; New Granada Haiti; British Legions	Defeat: Venezuelan independence	
Peruvian War of Independence (1811–26): Callao affair; Battle of Zepita; Battle of Junín; Battle of Ayacucho; Part of Spanish American wars of independence; Location: South America (Peru, Western Bolivia, Southern Ecuador)	Kingdom of Spain: (Spain) Viceroyalty of Peru; (Spain) Real Audiencia of Charcas; (Spain) Real Audiencia of Quito; (Spain) Peruvian Royalists	United Liberating Army: United Army (Argentine-Chilean); Gran Colombia; Republic of Peru; Peruvian patriots; British Legions (from 1824)	Defeat: Peru becomes independent of the Spanish monarchy.; End of mainland South American war of independence.	
Creole nationalists Revolts in Central America against Spanish rule (1811–20s): 1811 Independence Movement; Belén Conjuration; 1811-1812 Nicaragua Movements; 1814 Independence Movement; Location: Central America	Kingdom of Spain: New Spain; (Spain) Captaincy General of Guatemala	(Federal Republic of Central America) Central American revolutionaries First Mexican Empire (since 1821)	Inconclusive: Militar defeat of Central American revolutionaries.; Treason of pro-Mexican Gabino Gaínza to consolidate Central American secession.; Mexican annexation from 1822, starting another independentist campaign without Spanish participation.	
Huánuco rebellion (1812): Part of Peruvian War of Independence; Location: South America, Peru	Kingdom of Spain: (Spain) Viceroyalty of Peru; (Spain) Peruvian Royalists	Huánuco rebels	Victory	
Gutiérrez–Magee Expedition (1812): Part of Mexican War of Independence; Location: North America (modern southwestern United States)	Spain: Viceroyalty of New Spain	Republican Army of the North; Filibuster	Victory	
French invasion of Russia (1812): Part of the Napoleonic Wars; Location: Eastern Europe	(France) French Empire: Duchy of Warsaw; Napoleonic Italy; Naples; Confederation of the Rhine; Baden; Bavaria; Berg; Saxony; Westphalia; Bonapartist Spain; (Switzerland) Swiss Confederation; Allies: Austria Prussia Denmark–Norway	(Russia) Russian Empire	Defeat: Destruction of French Allied Army; Start of the War of the Sixth Coalition	
Anglo-American war (1812–1815): Gulf Theater 1813–1815; Battle of Pensacola; Part of Napoleonic Wars; Location: North America, Atlantic Ocean, Pacific Ocean	United Kingdom: (British Empire) British North America (The Canadas); Tecumseh's Confederacy; Kingdom of Spain (from 1813): (Spain) Spanish Florida	United States; Choctaw Nation Cherokee Nation Creek Allies	Inconclusive: Treaty of Ghent; Spain loses West Florida to the United States.	
Aponte conspiracy (1812): Part of Slave Revolts in North America and Age of Revolution; Location: Cuba	Kingdom of Spain: (Spain) Spanish Cuba	Slave conspirators	Victory	
Mendoza and Mojarra conspiracy (1812): Part of Slave Revolts in North America and Age of Revolution; Location: Dominican Republic	Kingdom of Spain: (Spain) Santo Domingo	Slave conspirators Supported by: Haiti	Victory	
War of the Sixth Coalition (1813–1814): Campaign in south-west France (1814); Part of Napoleonic Wars; Location: Europe	Russia; Prussia; Austria; United Kingdom; Sweden; Spain; Portugal (Kingdom of the Two Sicilies) Sicily; Sardinia	French Empire: Napoleonic Italy; Kingdom of Naples; Duchy of Warsaw; Denmark–Norway Confederation of the Rhine United States (War of 1812)	Victory	
Cuzco Rebellion of 1814 (1814): Part of Peruvian War of Independence; Location: South America, Peru	Kingdom of Spain: (Spain) Viceroyalty of Peru; Peruvian Royalists	Government Junta of Cuzco Supported by: (Argentina) United Provinces	Victory	
Spanish-Russian Skirmishes on California and Alaska (1814–15): Spanish raid on Tarasov's ship (1814); Part of Russo-Spanish Rivalry in the Pacific; Location: North Pacific Ocean (near Aleutian Islands and Pacific Northwest)	Spain: New Spain; (Spain) Colonial California; Indian auxiliaries	Russian Empire: Russian-America; Fort Ross; Aleuts Kodiaks United States	Victory: Spaniards capture baidarkas (navys) of the Russian-American Company and expel them from expanding in California.; Spaniards takes as prisoners the Russians, and its native allies, on the mission of San Pedro and Mission Santa Barbara until 1819. Some of them defected from Russians and stayed in the Spanish missions in California.; Possible martyrdom of Saint Peter the Aleut.	
War of the Seventh Coalition (1815): Part of Napoleonic Wars; Location: Western Europe	Seventh Coalition: United Kingdom; Prussia; Austrian Empire; Russian Empire (Province of Hanover) Hanover; Nassau; Brunswick; Sweden; Netherlands; Spain; Portugal; Sardinia (Kingdom of the Two Sicilies) Sicily; Tuscany; Switzerland (Kingdom of France) French Kingdom	(France) French Empire; Kingdom of Naples	Victory: Second Treaty of Paris; End of Napoleonic Wars; Second exile of Napoleon and second Bourbon Restoration; Beginning of the Concert of Europe	
Spanish reconquest of New Granada (1815–16): Part of Colombian War of Independence; Location: South America, (Colombia) and Caribbean Sea	Kingdom of Spain	United Provinces of New Granada	Victory: Reconquest of New Granada by the Spanish monarchy	
Seminole Wars (1817–18) Location: Florida	Seminole Kingdom of Spain: (Spain) Spanish Florida	United States	Defeat: Spain cedes Spanish Florida to the United States in the Adams–Onís Treaty of 1819; The United States forcibly relocates Seminole in northern Florida to a reservation in the center of the peninsula in the Treaty of Moultrie Creek of 1823	
Amelia Island affair (1817): Part of Spanish American wars of independence; Location: Florida	Kingdom of Spain: (Spain) Spanish Florida; United States	Republic of the Floridas Venezuela	No victor United States annexation of Florida.	
Guerra a muerte (1819–32): Part of Spanish American wars of independence; Location: Chile	Kingdom of Spain: (Spain) Captaincy General of Chile; Mapuche allies: Lafkenches; Wenches; Pehuenches; Boroans	Chile	Defeat	
Rebellion of Rafael de Riego (1820): part of Revolutions during the 1820s; Location: Spain	Kingdom of Spain	Liberal Rebels of Rafael del Riego Supported by: United Provinces of the River Plate	Defeat: Victory for the Spanish veinteañistas and the River Plate agents.; End of Sexenio Absolutista.; Cancellation of the gran expedición de Ultramar and withdrawal of Spanish European support to the royalists from Spanish American wars of independence.	
Totonicapán Uprising of 1820: Part of Independence of Central America and Indigenous rebellion on Mexico and Central America; Location: Central America, Guatemala	(Spain) Spanish Empire: (Spain) Captaincy General of Guatemala	K'iche of Totonicapán	Victory	
Spanish reconquest attempts in Mexico (1821–29): Part of Spanish American wars of independence; Location: Mexico	(Spain) Spanish Empire	Mexico	Defeat: Spain recognizes the independence of the United Mexican States in 1836	
Dominican War of Independence (1821–22) Location: Hispaniola	(Spain) Spanish Empire	Republic of Spanish Haiti Haiti	Political defeat, Militarily inconclusive due to Haitian Invasion of Santo Domingo.	
Royalist War (1822–23): part of Revolutions during the 1820s; Location: Spain	Kingdom of Spain Royalists forces: Spanish absolutists; Ultras/Apostolics (traditionalists); Supported by: Quintuple Alliance	Junta Provisional Consultiva Liberals (constitucionals) forces: Doceañista/Moderados (liberal conservatives); Exaltados (radical liberals)	Absolutist victory: End of the Trienio Liberal; Intervention of France.	
French invasion of Spain (1823) Location: Spain	Kingdom of France (Spain) Armée de la Foi	(Spain) Partisans of the Cortes	Royalist victory: Start of Ominous Decade; A part of the French army would remain occupying Spain until 1828 to save the Counter-revolutionary regime.; Scandal of the Spanish Marketers in France.	
Novales Revolt (1823): Part of Philippine revolts against SpainLocation: Philippines	Kingdom of Spain: (Spain) Philippines	Filipino and Hispanic American Rebels	Royalist Victory: Death of Mariano Fernández de Folgueras (royalist), Andrés Novales (liberal) and other persons.; Expulsion of Luis Rodríguez-Varela and other liberal conspirators.	
Chilean conquest of Chiloé (1824–26): Part of Spanish American wars of independence; Location: Chile, Chiloé Island	Kingdom of Spain: (Spain) Governorate of Chiloé	Chile	Defeat. End of Spanish presence in South America.	
Capture of the sloop Anne (1825): Part of West Indies anti-piracy operations of the United States; Location: Caribbean	Tri-national anti-piracy alliance: Denmark; (Denmark) Danish West Indies; Spain; (Spain) Puerto Rico; United States	Roberto Cofresí's pirates	Victory	
War of the Aggrieved (1827) Location: Spain	Kingdom of Spain: Spanish absolutists (moderate royalists); Supported by: Kingdom of France	Cuerpo de Voluntarios Realistas rebel forces: Ultra-royalits/Apostolics (traditionalists)	Victory: The Agraviados, who rose up against the "reformist" Enlightened absolutism government that supposedly had King Ferdinand VII "kidnapped", lay down their arms when Ferdinand VII had to go to Catalonia to demonstrate that he enjoyed full freedom.	
Portuguese Civil War (1828–34): Part of Revolutions of 1830; Location: Portugal	Liberal Forces of Queen Maria II and Pedro IV Supported by: Spain (Since 1834) United Kingdom France (Since 1830) Belgian volunteers (1832–1834)	Traditionalist Forces of King Miguel; Supported by: Spain (Until 1833) Papal States Russia	Liberal victory: Concession of Evoramonte: Constitutional monarchy is restored; Dom Miguel renounces all his claims to the throne and goes into exile.	
First Carlist War (1833–1839): Part of Carlist Wars; Part of Revolutions of 1830; Location: Spain	Christinos: (Spain) Forces of Queen Isabella II Supported by: United Kingdom (France) French Kingdom (Portugal) Forces of Queen Maria II	Carlists: Forces of Infante Carlos; Forces of King Miguel; Supported by: Portugal (until 1834) Holy Alliance	Liberal victory: British mediated Convention of Vergara.	125,000 dead (Note: 10,250 foreign allies dead)
Riot of La Granja de San Ildefonso (1835); Location: Spain	(Spain) Forces of Queen Isabella II: Moderate Party	Progresivists	Defeat: End of Estamento de los Procuradores and reinstauration of Constitution of 1812 in sustition of Spanish Royal Statute of 1834.	
Second Egyptian-Ottoman War (1839–1841): Part of Oriental Crisis of 1840; Location: Levant	Eyalet of Egypt Kingdom of France Kingdom of Spain	Ottoman Empire (United Kingdom) British Empire Austrian Empire (Russia) Russian Empire Kingdom of Prussia	Defeat: Egypt renounces claim on Syria, Britain recognizes Muhammad Ali and his descendants as the legitimate rulers of Egypt.	
Bullanges Revolt (1835–1843): Anti-clerical riots of 1835; Octubrada; Bombardment of Barcelona (1842); JamánciaLocation: Catalonia and Basque Country	Carlist Kingdom of Spain (until 1840) Isabelline Kingdom of Spain	Catalan Bullanges (Radical-liberals): Revolutionary Junta of Barcelona	Victory of moderate liberals.: Abolition of Protectionism in the Spanish economy to benefit Foreign trade against Local Catalan industry.; Increase of the Centralisation of the Government.	
Revolt of the indigenous Benga against their king Bonkoro I (1843–1858) Location: Africa, Gulf of Guinea	Spain: Benga people, from Corisco Bay, loyal to Bonkoro I and under Spanish protectorate	Benga people rebels led by Imunga	Stalemate: The throne of the ndowés (Kingdom of Corisco) remains separated into two branches (Cabo San Juan and the north of the Corisco island) since 1843.; Bonkoro I flee to Cape san juan and complies the arrangement with Juan José Lerena y Barry (Treaty of Tika) of establishing a Spanish protectorate. His son, king Bonkoro II recognized Spanish sovereignty over Cabo San Juan, including several towns that had not been ceded by his father, such as Corisco and Elobey.; Imunga proclaims himself as king Munga I of Kombe people, then reigned in Corisco between the years 1848 and 1858, date on which he received the support of the first Spanish governor, Carlos de Chacón y Michelena, who appointed him lieutenant governor of Corisco, transforming also in a Spanish protectorate.; In 1906 the two parts of the kingdom (Cabo San Juan and northern Corisco) were reunited under the kingdom of Santiago Uganda.	
Second Carlist War (1846–49): Part of Carlist Wars and Revolutions of 1848; Location: Spain	Spain	Carlist insurgents	Liberal victory	10,000 dead
Patuleia (1846): part of Revolution of Maria da Fonte; Location: Portugal	Forces of Queen Maria II: Cartista (conservative liberals); Quadruple Alliance: Spain; United Kingdom	Junta in Porto forces: Septembrists (radical liberals); Miguelist (traditionalists)	Victory: Convention of Gramido	
Solís Uprising (1846) Location: Galicia (Spain)	(Spain) Spanish Government	Provincialistas Rebels led by Colonel Miguel Solís y Cuetos	Victory: Revolt suppressed	
Italian Revolution of 1848 (1848–49): part of Revolutions of 1848 in the Italian states and Unification of Italy; Location: Italy	Austrian Empire: Kingdom of Lombardy–Venetia; Grand Duchy of Tuscany Kingdom of Two Sicilies Papal States Spain (1849) (French Second Republic) French Republic (1849)	Kingdom of Sicily Provisional Government of Milan Republic of San Marco Roman Republic Supported by: Kingdom of Sardinia	Victory: Papal rule restored in Rome	
Spanish expedition to Balanguingui (1848) Location: Philippines (Sulu Sea)	Spain: (Spain) Philippines	Moro Pirates	Victory	
Lopez Expedition (1850–1851) Location: Cuba	Spain: (Spain) Cuba	Filibusters	Victory	
Spanish Revolution of 1854 Location: Spain	Kingdom of Spain: Moderate Party	Rebel troops: Democratic Party; Progressive Party	Rebel victory of Leopoldo O'Donnell and Baldomero Espartero.: End of Década moderada and start of Bienio progresista.; Expulsion of Maria Christina of the Two Sicilies from Spain.	
Carlist Insurrection of 1855 Location: Spain	Kingdom of Spain: Liberals	Carlist insurgents	Victory of the government	
Cibaenian Revolution (1848–49)Location: Dominican Republic	Dominican Republic Liberals Supported by: Conservatives Kingdom of Spain	Revolutionary Government of Cibao	Victory	
El Arahal insurrection (1857) Location: Spain (Seville)	Kingdom of Spain	Peasant rebels Republicans Freemasonry	Victory of the government	
Cochinchina Campaign (1858–62): Siege of Tourane; Siege of Đà Nẵng; Siege of Saigon; Battle of Ky Hoa; Capture of Mỹ Tho; Capture of Biên Hòa; Capture of Vĩnh Long; Location: Southern Vietnam	Spain: (Spain) Philippines; (France) French Empire	Đại Nam	Victory: Treaty of Saigon: Cochinchina becomes a French colony.	
Hispano-Moroccan War (1859–60): Battle of Castillejos; Battle of Tétouan; Location: North Africa (Morocco)	Spain	Morocco	Victory: Treaty of Wad-Ras: Morocco recognises Spanish sovereignty over Sidi Ifni and Western Sahara.; Morocco pays 400 million reales as war reparations	1,152 killed 2,888 died of disease
Carlist Landing of 1860 Location: Spain	Kingdom of Spain: Liberals	Carlist insurgents	Victory of the government	
Post-Unification Italian Brigandage (1861–1865): Borges Expedition; Acinello Battle; Location: Southern Italy	Brigandage: (Kingdom of the Two Sicilies) Bourbon legitimists in Southern Italy; Italian Gangs; Carlist partisans from Bourbon Spain; Supported by: Papal States; Spain	Kingdom of Italy Supported by: (Second French Empire) French Empire	Defeat: Francis II of the Two Sicilies isn't restored to the throne.; José Borges is arrested and fusiled by House of Savoy.	
Franco-Mexican War (1861–67) Location: Mexico	(France) French Empire (Mexico) Mexican Empire Supported by: Austrian Empire; Spain (until 1862); United Kingdom (until 1862); Belgium Eyalet of Egypt Confederate exiles Polish exiles	Mexican republicans Supported by: United States	Withdrawal: Establishment, then fall, of the Second Mexican Empire; French withdrawal; Execution of Emperor Maximilian I, Miguel Miramon, and Tomas Mejia.	
Loja uprising (1861) Location: Spain	Kingdom of Spain	Socialists	Victory of the government	
Dominican Restoration War (1863–65): Battle of Monte Cristi; Location: Hispaniola, Dominican Republic	Spain: Captaincy General of Santo Domingo (Dominican annexationists); Captaincy General of Puerto Rico; Captaincy General of Cuba	Dominican Republic	Defeat: Restoration of Dominican sovereignty	10,888 killed or wounded 30,000 died of disease
Chincha Islands War (1864–66): Battle of Papudo; Battle of Abtao; Capture of the Paquete de Maule; Valparaíso bombardment; Battle of Callao; Action of 22 August 1866; Location: Peru and Chile Coasts	Spain	Chile; Peru; Nominal participation: Ecuador; Bolivia	Indecisive, both sides claimed victory: The state of war is maintained between the belligerent parties until the signing of an indefinite armistice in 1871.; Peace treaties between Spain and Perú (1879), Bolivia (1879), Chile (1883) and Ecuador (1885).	300
Glorious Revolution (1868) Location: Spain	Kingdom of Spain: Moderate Party	Revolutionaries: Liberal Union; Progressive Party; Democratic Party	Defeat: Expulsion of Isabella II and Establishment of a Provisional Government; Start of Sexenio Democrático	

== Restoration ==
Conflict	Combatant 1	Combatant 2	Results	Spanish casualties
Ten Years' War (1868–78): Battle of Pino de Baire; Battle of Las Guasimas; Location: Cuba	Spain: Captaincy General of Cuba	Cuban rebels Supported by: (Dominican Republic) (Mexico) Hispanic American Volunteers	Victory: Pact of Zanjón	90,000 dead
Grito de Lares (1868): Battle of El Pepino (1868); Location: Puerto Rico	Spain: Captaincy General of Puerto Rico	Puerto Rico rebels	Victory	
Carlist insurrection of 1869 Location: Spain	Kingdom of Spain: Liberals	Carlist insurgents	Government victory	
Carlist insurrection of 1870 Location: Spain	Kingdom of Spain: Liberals	Carlist insurgents	Government victory	
Cavite mutiny (1872) Location: Philippines	Spain: Captaincy General of the Philippines	Filipino mutineers	Victory	
Third Carlist War (1872–76): Part of Carlist Wars; Location: Spain	Kingdom of Spain (1872–73); I Republic (1873–74); Kingdom of Spain (1875–76)	Carlist insurgents	Royal Victory	50,000 dead
Cantonal rebellion (1872–74) Location: Spain	(Spain) I Republic	Canton of Cartagena: Cantonalist	Victory of the Republican Government	
Petroleum Revolution (1873) Location: Spain	(Spain) I Republic: Alcoy City Hall	Committee of Public Health Spanish Regional Federation of the IWA	Victory of the Republican Government	
Little War (1879–1880) Location: Cuba	Spain	Cuban rebels	Victory	
Carolines Question (1885) Location: Western Pacific Ocean (Caroline islands and Palau)	Spain: (Spain) Spanish East Indies	Germany: German New Guinea	Victory	
Spanish-Oulad conflict (1887–1898): Álvarez Pérez, del Draa Expedition; Cervera-Rizzo-Quiroga Expedition Location: Western Sahara and Mauritania	Spain: (Spain) Spanish Sahara; Pro-Spanish tribes: Oulad Bou Sbaa	Anti-Spanish tribes: Oulad Delim	Defeat: Spanish Africanist temporally retreat of Villa Cisneros.; Spain renounces territorial expansion (on Adrar Plateau) in favour of France.	
Jerez uprising (1892) Location: Spain	Spain	Anarchist peasants	Victory of the Spanish State	
Verduleras' Mutiny (1892); Location: Spain	Spain	Madrid verduleras	Victory and revolt repressed	
Gamazada (1893–1894): Sanrokada; The night of the Sagasta shootingLocation: Basque Country	Spain	Basques Supported by: Carlist	Defeat of the Spanish government: Fueros of Navarre aren't abolished by liberals.	
First Melillan campaign (1893–1894) Location: North Africa	Spain	Kingdom of Morocco	Victory: Treaty of Fez: Morocco pays war reparations of 20 million pesetas and pledges to pacify northern provinces.; Melilla hinterlands ceded to Spain.	
Cuban War of Independence (1895–1898): Action of 25 April 1898; First Battle of Cárdenas; Battle of Cárdenas; Battle of Cienfuegos; Battle of Guantánamo Bay; Action of 13 June 1898; Battle of Las Guasimas; First Battle of Manzanillo; Battle of Tayacoba; Battle of the Aguadores; Battle of El Caney; Battle of San Juan Hill; Second Battle of Manzanillo; Battle of Santiago de Cuba; Siege of Santiago; Third Battle of Manzanillo; Battle of Nipe Bay; Battle of Rio Manimani; Part of Spanish–American War; Location: Cuba	Spain: (Spain) Captaincy General of Cuba	Cuban rebels United States	Defeat: American Intervention; Expulsion of the Spanish colonial government during Spanish–American War (1898).; Treaty of Paris; Protectorate over Cuba; Cuban independence	45,100 dead
Philippine Revolution (1896–1898): Cry of Pugad Lawin; Battle of Manila; Battle of Sambat; Cry of Tarlac; Battle of Pasong Tamo; Battle of San Juan del Monte; Battle of San Mateo and Montalban; 1896 Manila mutiny; Battle of San Francisco de Malabon; Battle of Noveleta; Kawit revolt; Cry of Nueva Ecija; Battle of Imus; Battle of San Francisco de Malabon; Battle of Talisay; Battles of Batangas; Battle of Binakayan–Dalahican; Battle of Pateros; Battle of Kakarong de Sili; Battle of Zapote Bridge; Battle of Perez Dasmariñas; Retreat to Montalban; Battle of Aliaga; Raid at Paombong; Battle of Tres de Abril; Battle of Camalig; Battle of Calamba; Battle of Alapan; Siege of Baler; Battle of Tayabas; Battle of Manila; Siege of Masbate; Negros Revolution; Battle of Barrio Yoting; Battle of Sapong Hills; Siege of Zamboanga; Part of Spanish–American War; Location: Philippines	Spain: Philippines loyalists; Guardia Civil	Katipunan Revolutionaries; 1896–1897: Tagalog Republic 1897; Republic of Biak-na-Bato (until 1897) Filipino rebels (1898); United States (1898)	Peace Treaty (1897): Signing of Pact of Biak-na-Bato.; Defeat (1898): Resumption of hostilities during Spanish–American War.; Expulsion of the Spanish colonial government.; Establishment of First Philippine Republic with Emilio Aguinaldo as the first President (1899); Outbreak of the Philippine–American War (1899).	
Intentona de Yauco (1897) Location: Puerto Rico	Spain: Captaincy General of Puerto Rico	Puerto Rican rebels	Victory	
Spanish–American War (1898): Puerto Rico campaign; Capture of Guam; Part of Banana Wars; Location: Caribbean and Philippine Sea	Spain: Captaincy General of Puerto Rico; Captaincy General of Cuba; Spanish East Indies	United States	Defeat: Treaty of Paris (1898): USA gains Cuba, Puerto Rico and Philippines.; German–Spanish Treaty (1899): Spain sells its last colonies to German Empire.; End of Spanish Empire in America, Asia and Oceania	1,000 killed 800 wounded 15,000 died of disease 30,000 captured
1898 Guinean rebellion led by Sas-Ebuera (1898) Location: Bight of Biafra, Bioko Island (Modern Equatorial Guinea)	Spain: Spanish Guinea	Bubis rebels	Victory	
1900 Carlist Sublevation (1900) Location: Spain (near Badalona)	Kingdom of Spain	Carlist insurgents	Alfonsist Victory	
Siege of the International Legations (1900): Part of Boxer Rebellion; Location: China, Peking	Eight-Nation Alliance: France; British Empire; Australia; New Zealand; India; Russia; Japan; Germany; United States; Italy; Austria-Hungary; Netherlands; Belgium; Spain; Mutual Protection of Southeast China	Qing dynasty Yìhéquán	Victory: Boxer Protocol	
Venezuelan Crisis of 1902–1903 (1902–1903) Location: Venezuela and Caribbean Sea	United Kingdom Germany Italy Support: Spain; Mexico; Belgium; Netherlands; Denmark	Venezuela Support: Argentina; United States	Compromise: European fleet withdraws after Washington Protocols.	
1906 Carlist insurrection Location: Spain ( Valls, Calella, Rajadell)	Kingdom of Spain	Carlist insurgents	Alfonsist Victory	
French conquest of Morocco (1907–1934): Bombardment of Casablanca; Chaouia campaign; Ma al-'Aynayn and Ahmed al-Hiba uprising; Wayaha Uld Ali Uld Cheij raids; Part of Scramble for Africa; Location: Maghreb (Morocco and Western Sahara)	France: French Algeria; Spain	Morocco Chaouia tribes Zaian Confederation Various other tribes	Victory: Partition of Morocco into French and Spanish zones	
Second Melillan campaign (1909–1910): Part of Spanish-Moroccan conflicts and Scramble for Africa; Location: North America	Spain	(Morocco) Rif tribes	Victory: Melilla territory extended to Cape Three Forks and the Bḥar Ameẓẓyan lagoon	
Tragic Week (1909); Location: Spain	Kingdom of Spain	Anarchists Socialists Republicans Freemasons	Victory of the Spanish government	
Bubi uprising of 1910 (1910) Location: Bight of Biafra, Bioko Island (Modern Equatorial Guinea)	Spain: Spanish Guinea	Bubis rebels	Victory: Colonial forces pressured King Malabo to influence local chiefs and prevent further confrontation	
Agadir Crisis (1911): Moroccan Rebellion; Location: North Africa (Morocco)	France Spain British Empire	Morocco Germany	Military Victory: Spain occupy Larache and Ksar el-Kebir.; Diplomatic Failure: Due to Morocco–Congo Treaty, a Franco-Spanish Treaty was concluded on 27 November 1912, slightly revising the previous Franco-Spanish boundaries in Morocco, in favour to France.	
Mutiny on the frigate Numancia (1911) Location: North Africa (Tangier)	(Restoration (Spain)) Government	Frigate Numancia mutiners and republicans	Victory of the monarchical Government	
Kert campaign (1911–1912): Part of Spanish-Moroccan conflicts and Scramble for Africa; Location: North Africa (Morocco)	Spain	(Morocco) Riffian tribes	Victory: Consolidation of the Spanish-controlled territory in Kelaïa east of the Kert River	
Royalist attack on Chaves (1912) Location: Iberian Peninsula (Galicia and Portugal)	(Portugal) Royalist supporters Supported by: Spain	Portugal	Defeat: Henrique Mitchell de Paiva Cabral Couceiro runs to Galicia, Spain. Then proclaim the Monarchy of the North years later.	
Spanish liberal state crisis (1917–1923): 1917 Spanish general strike; Pistolerismo; Bolshevik triennium; Faeneras rebellion; Canadenca strike; 1919 Spanish general strike; Tarancón mutiny; part of Revolutions of 1917–1923 and Background of the Spanish Civil War; Location: Spain	(Restoration (Spain)) Government: Conservative Party; Armed Forces; Defense Councils; Spanish police; Somatén; Employers Paramilitary militia: Defensa Ciudadana; Unión Ciudadana; Sindicatos Libres: Carlists	Spanish workers' movement: UGT; PSOE; CNT; Anarchist action groups; Marxists action groups	Stalemate: Left-wing and Syndicalist movements fails in their attempts to make a Socialist Revolution, but the demands of working classes (Social question) are attended by Regenerationist reformers with laws about Workers' Retirement, Eight-hour working day, Sunday Rest, etc. Institutions like the Ministry of Labour are also made.; The Reign of Alfonso XIII enters on the Dictatorship of Primo de Rivera after 1923 Spanish coup d'état, ending Caciquism and political oligarchy. Thus making a crisis on the Spanish Conservatism due to conflicts between Ciervists, Datists and Maurists after the crisis in the turnist system between Conservative Party and the Liberal Party, as also heterogeneous influence from Catholic social teaching, Maurrassisme, Integralismo Lusitano and Fascist Italy to solve Social question by their own way.; Ascension of Carlism (Traditionalist) as a mass movement in reactionary circles, due to crisis on liberal monarchists (Alfonsism) and the right-wing after authoritarian politics.; Apparition of Spanish fascists.	
Río Muni Punishment Expedition (1918) Location: Africa, Guinea region (Modern Equatorial Guinea)	Spain: Spanish Guinea	Fang people: Mawomo	Victory: Colonial Guard of Spanish Guinea will do military campaigns to subdue the indigenous Fang people in Río Muni until 1929.	
Spanish conquest of Continental Guinea (1920s–1930s) Location: Africa, Guinea region (Modern Equatorial Guinea)	Spain: Spanish Guinea; Askari	Fang people: Osumu; Bubi people	Victory: Spanish presence was consolidated in Río Muni, establishing missions, plantations and military posts throughout the interior of the Guinean territory.; Ángel Barrera, and then Miguel Núñez de Prado, were replaced after denounciation of abuse against indigenous peoples (which were raided and put to forced labor in the Prestaciones). The General Government, under pressure from the General Directorate of Morocco and Colonies, passed a law in 1929 that punished abusers.	
Rif War (1920–1926); Location: North Africa (Morocco)	Spain: Spanish protectorate in Morocco; France: French protectorate in Morocco	Republic of the Rif	Victory: Debellation of the Republic of the Rif	18,000 killed or died of disease 5,000 wounded or missing
Anarchist uprising in Berane (1924)Location: Basque Country	Kingdom of Spain	Anarchists	Victory	
Jaca uprising (1930) Location: Spain	Kingdom of Spain	Spanish republicans	Victory	

== Second Spanish Republic ==
Conflict	Combatant 1	Combatant 2	Results	Spanish casualties
Anarchist insurrections against Spanish Republic (1932–37): Alt Llobregat insurrection (1932); Anarchist insurrection of January 1933; Casas Viejas incident; Anarchist insurrection of December 1933; Anarchist revolt in Labastida (1933); Bujalance incidents(1933); May Days (1937); Spanish political violence during 1931-1936 and Spanish Civil War; Location: Spain	Spanish Republic: Generalitat of Catalonia; Communist Party of Spain: Unified Socialist Party of Catalonia; Supported by Soviet Union	CNT-FAI FIJL Friends of Durruti Group POUM Confederal militias Anarchist commune (1937): Regional Defence Council of Aragon; Popular Executive Committee of Valencia; Sovereign Council of Asturias and León; Santander Defense Council; Gijón War Committee; Junta de Seguretat Interior de Catalunya; Madrid Defense Council	1° Victory of the Spanish State and repression of Spanish Anarchists. Division between moderates which wanted to collaborate with Spanish Republic (Treintists and Possibilists of the Syndicalist Party) and Radicals opposed to the State (Faístas). 2° Truce between Anarchists and Republicans during Spanish Revolution of 1936. 3° Anarchists, Anarcho-Syndicalists Libertarian socialist and Libertarian Communism are defeated by Marxists Communists, Leninists and Stalinists during the internal conflict between left-wing groups during Spanish Civil War.	
Communists revolts during Spanish Republic (1932): La Villa de Don Fadrique Revolt; Villalpande incident; Part of Spanish political violence during 1931-1936	Spanish Republic	Communist Party of Spain	Victory of the Spanish moderate left	
Military reactions against Spanish Republic (1932): Sanjurjada; Part of Background of the Spanish Civil War	Spanish Republic	Monarchical and Right-Wing rebel forces: CEDA; Renovación Española; Requetés/CT; Decurias; Spanish Military Union	Victory of the Spanish Republic	
Revolution of 1934: Asturian miners' strike of 1934; Events of 6 October; Part of Spanish political violence during 1931-1936; Location: Spain	Spanish Republic	Asturian Workers Alliance: PSOE; UGT; CNT; Militias; Catalan State: Mossos d'Esquadra; Escamots	Victory: The Spanish Republican government effectively eliminates the rebellions in Asturias and Catalonia.	
Extremaduran peasant rebellion (1936) Location: Spain (Extremadura)	Spanish Republic	UGT: National Federation of Land Workers	Peasant victory	0
Spanish Civil War (1936–39): (See Category:Battles of the Spanish Civil War for battles); Locations: Spain, Morocco, Western Sahara, and Guinea	Republicans: People's Army; Popular Front; UGT; CNT-FAI; POUM (Note: The POUM fought in the Spanish Civil War from 17 July 1936 until 16 June 1937, when the POUM was illegalized and suppressed by the Popular Front Republican government led by Prime Minister Juan Negrín, with the government suppression of the POUM supported by Joseph Stalin, the Comintern and the PCE.); Generalitat de Catalunya; Euzko Gudarostea (Note: The Euzko Gudarostea fought in the Spanish Civil War from 17 July 1936 until it surrendered to the Italian Corpo Truppe Volontarie in the Santoña Agreement on 24 August 1937.); International Brigades; Foreign volunteers; Soviet Union	Nationalists: FET y de las JONS (Note: The only party under Francisco Franco from 1937 onward, a merger of the other factions on the Nationalist side.); FE de las JONS (Note: 1936–1937, then merged into FET y de las JONS); Requetés/CT; CEDA; Spanish Renovation; Army of Africa; Viriatos; Foreign volunteers; Italy; Germany	Nationalist victory: End of the Second Spanish Republic; Establishment of the Spanish State under the rule of Francisco Franco; Post-war Francoist mass killings and repression; Spanish Maquis continue irregular warfare sporadically until 1965	500,000–1,000,000 dead
1936 uprising in Spanish Guinea (1936): Part of Spanish Civil War; Location: Spanish Guinea	(Spain) Spanish Republic	(Francoist Spain) Nationalist Spain	Nationalist victory: Hispanicization of the zone and legally unification of Fernando Poo and Río Muni with the rest of Spain.; Gradual Emancipation of the natives.	

== Francoist Spain ==
Conflict	Combatant 1	Combatant 2	Results	Spanish casualties
Spanish Maquis (1939–1965): Invasion of Val d'Aran; Location: Spain	Francoist Spain; Supported by: Nazi Germany (1939–1945); Fascist Italy (1939–1943); United States (after 1953)	Republican Partisans; Supported by: French Resistance (1940–1944); Italian Resistance (1943–1945); Soviet Union (until 1956)	Francoist Victory. Decline and eventual extinction of Maquis activity	
Carlist-Falangist internal conflict and conspiracies inner Francoist Regime (1939-1950s): May 1941 Crisis; Begoña Bombing; August 1942 Crisis; Location: Spain	Francoist Spain: FET y de las JONS	Requetés/CT Supported by: Vatican City; United Kingdom; Anti-Francoist Falangists Supported by: Nazi Germany	Government victory: Fall of Ramón Serrano Suñer (pro-falangist) and Valentín Galarza (pro-carlist) on Franco's regime.; End of Fascistization politics and First Francoism.; Repression of both National-syndicalist and Traditionalist-monarchists.	
Spanish occupation of Tangier (1940–1945) Location: North Africa (Morocco)	Spain: Spanish protectorate in Morocco	Tangier International Zone	Inconclusive: Spanish withdrawal after the end of World War II	
Eastern Front (World War II) (1941–1945) Volunteers only: Siege of Leningrad; Battle of Krasny Bor; Location: Europe	Axis powers: Germany; Romania (until 1944); Italy (until 1943); Hungary; Axis puppet states: Slovakia; Croatia; Co-belligerents: Finland (until 1944); Bulgaria (until 1944); Spain: Spanish Volunteers Blue Division (until 1944)	Allies: Soviet Union; Poland; Czechoslovakia (from 1943); (Democratic Federal Yugoslavia) Yugoslavia (from 1944); (Tuvan People's Republic) Tuva (until 1944); Former Axis powers or co-belligerents: Romania (from 1944); Bulgaria (from 1944); Finland (from 1944); Aerial and naval only: United States; United Kingdom; Free France (1943–45); Volunteers: Exiled Spanish Republic Volunteers; La Nueve	Soviet-allied victory	22,700
Ifni War (1957–1958): Siege of Sidi Ifni; Battle of Edchera; Operation Écouvillon; Location: North Africa (Morocco and Western Sahara)	Spain: Ifni; Spanish Sahara; France: Colonial Mauritania	Morocco: Liberation Army; Allied Sahrawi tribes	Victory: Treaty of Angra de Cintra	190 dead
Basque conflict (1959–1975) Location: Spain (Basque Country)	Spain	Euskadi Ta Askatasuna	Inconclusive: ETA continued its terrorist activities during the Spanish transition to democracy period and the subsequent Spanish Democracy pursuant to the 1978 Constitution	
Pro-Moroccan Guerrilla Warfare against Spanish North-Africa (1968–1975): 1975 Hausa Post Attack; Attack against Ceuta (1975); Location: Africa (Western Sahara and Plazas de soberanía)	Spain: Spanish Sahara; Ceuta; Melilla	FLU (Frente de Liberación y Unidad); MOREHOB (Mouvement révolutionnaire des hommes bleus); Supported by: Morocco	Victory: Successful repression against Greater Morocco aspirations until Moroccan direct intervention.; Moroccan apologies for the terrorism against Spain in 1976.	
Spain-Equatorial Guinea Crisis (1969)Location: Africa (Bioko)	Spain	Equatorial Guinea	Ceasefire: United Nations mediation	
Zemla Intifada (1970): Part of Western Sahara conflict; Location: Africa, Western Sahara	Spain: Spanish Sahara	(Western Sahara) Movement for the Liberation of Saguia el Hamra and Wadi el Dhahab	Victory: Repression and end of the Harakat Tahrir movement.	
Western Sahara Revolt (1973–75): Part of Western Sahara conflict; Location: Africa, Western Sahara	Spain: Spanish Sahara; Djema'a; Sahrawi National Union Party	(Western Sahara) Polisario Front of National Liberation: Deserters from Tropas Nómadas; Limited Support: Algeria (Libya) Libyan Arab Republic	Inconclusive: Proclamation of the Sahrawi Arab Democratic Republic.; Spanish unilateral withdrawal from the Sahara pursuant to the 1975 tripartite Madrid Accords.; The Polisario Front continued the struggle for self-determination against Mauritania and Morocco, beginning the Western Sahara War.	
Anti-Spanish Terrorist Warfare in Western Sahara (1974–75): Attack on the Tifariti Government Post (1974); Assassination of Ahmed Ould Brahim Ould Bachir (1975); Kidnapping of Antonio Martin Hernandez (1975); The hijacking of the Mahbes and Smara patrols (1975); Location: Western Sahara, Canary Islands and Mauritania	Spain: Spanish Sahara	(Western Sahara) Polisario Front (Morocco) Pro-Moroccan Sahrawi nationalists: FLU (Frente de Liberación y Unidad)	Inconclusive, mostly defeat	
Green March (1975): Part of Western Sahara conflict; Location: Africa(Western Sahara and Morocco)	Spain: Spanish Sahara	Morocco Supported by: Mauritania	Inconclusive: Operation Golondrina: Spanish withdrawal.; Moroccan annexation of Western Sahara and start of Western Sahara War.	

== Modern ==
Conflict	Combatant 1	Combatant 2	Results
Basque conflict (1975–2011) Location: Basque Country region (Spain and France)	Spain; France; Supported by: European Union; United Kingdom; United States; Canada	Euskadi Ta Askatasuna	Victory: ETA declares definitive cessation of its terrorist activities.
Anti-Spanish Terrorist Warfare in Western Sahara (1975–1987): Fos Bucraa attack (1976); Attack on the fishing vessel Cruz del Mar (1978); Attack on the fishing boat Junquito (1985); Attack on the Tagomago patrol car (1985); Location: Western Sahara, Canary Islands and Morocco	Spain Morocco	(Western Sahara) Sahrawi Arab Democratic Republic: Polisario Front	Stalemate: Spain broke relationships with Sahrawi Arab Democratic Republic from 1985 to 1986, then Polisario Front are forced to stop raiding Spaniards.
As Encrobas Conflict (1975–2007) Location: Spain (Galicia)	Spain	Peasant revolters	Inconclusive: Most of the residents abandoned their homes.
Búnker's Confrontations (1975–early 1980s): Operation Gladio; Operation Reconquista (1976); Montejurra massacre (1976); 1977 Atocha massacre; Operation Galaxia (1978); 1981 Spanish coup attempt; 1982 Spanish coup attempt; 1985 Spanish coup attempt; Part of Far-right terrorism in Spain and Cold War; Location: Spain	Spain: Opposition to Francoism; Democratic Junta of Spain Limited Support: European Union; Euskadi Ta Askatasuna (1976–1978)	(Francoist Spain) Neo-Francoists: Warriors of Christ The King; Fuerza Nueva; Spanish Basque Battalion; Anti-Communist Apostolic Alliance; Spanish Armed Groups	Democratic victory: Spanish transition to democracy success
War of the Fleas (1976–1979) Location: Canary Islands	Spain	Canary Islands Independence Movement: Fuerzas Armadas Guanches; Destacamentos Armados Canarios; Limited Support: Algeria Libya	Victory: Fuerzas Armadas Guanches dissolve
Bonito War (1990s) Location: Atlantic Ocean	Spain	United Kingdom; France; Ireland	Inconclusive: The efforts of all the governments involved managed to end the tension between the fleets, but there would still be protests from the Spanish fishing fleet.
Gulf War (1991) Location: Persian Gulf (Iraq, Kuwait, Saudi Arabia)	Kuwait United States United Kingdom Spain Saudi Arabia France Egypt Syria Other Allies	Ba'athist Iraq	Victory: Kuwait regains its independence
Turbot War (1994–1996) Location: Grand Banks of Newfoundland and English Channel	Spain; European Union	Canada	Defeat: Canadian Position Recognized; In 1996, Canada agrees not to apply its laws to Spanish fishing vessels with criteria of extraterritoriality.
Kosovo War (1998–99): part of Yugoslav Wars; Location: Balkans (Kosovo and Albania)	KLA NATO	FR Yugoslavia	Victory: Kumanovo Treaty; Yugoslav forces pull out of Kosovo
War in Afghanistan (2001–2021): Spain in the Afghan Conflict; Battle of Sabzak; Resolute Support Mission; Operation Harekate Yolo; Operation Enduring Freedom; Operation Estaca; Operation Ontur; Part of the war on terror; Location: Afghanistan	Afghanistan ISAF	Islamic Emirate of Afghanistan	Defeat: Fall of Taliban regime; Osama bin Laden killed; Renewed Taliban offensive in 2021; Taliban forces capture Kabul on 15 August 2021
Operation Active Endeavour (2001–2016): Part of the war on terror	NATO Non-NATO: Georgia; Israel; Morocco; New Zealand; Russia (2006); Ukraine; Bulgaria (until 2004); Estonia (until 2004); Latvia (until 2004); Lithuania (until 2004); Romania (until 2004); Slovakia (until 2004); Slovenia (until 2004); Albania (until 2009); Croatia (until 2009)	Unspecified terrorist and smuggling groups	"Victory": Continued by Operation Sea Guardian
Perejil Island crisis (2002) Location: North Africa, Perejil Island	Spain	Morocco	Victory: Moroccan soldiers removed by Spanish military
Iraq War (2003–04): Operation Falconer; 2003 Latifiya ambush; 2004 Iraq spring fighting; Battle of Nayaf; Plus Ultra Brigade actions; Multinational Division Central-South; Part of Iraqi conflict; Location: Middle East (Iraq)	MNF–I: United States; United Kingdom; Poland; Denmark; Australia (2003–09); Italy (2003–06); Spain (2003–04); Dominican Republic (2003–04); Honduras (2003–04); Nicaragua (2003–04); El Salvador (2003–09); Iraq after the fall of Saddam Hussein Iraqi Kurdistan	Iraq under Saddam Hussein Various insurgents	Coalition victory: Fall of Ba'athist rule in Iraq; Deployment in Najaf; Spanish withdrawal in 2004, escalation of sectarian insurgency after U.S. withdrawal in 2011
2004 Equatorial Guinea coup attempt (2004)Location: Africa (Equatorial Guinea)	Private mercenaries; Supported by: Private financial backers; Spain (alleged); France (alleged); United Kingdom (alleged)	Equatorial Guinea; Supported by: Zimbabwe	Defeated: Brief damage in the Equatorial Guinea–Spain relations.
Attacks over UN peacekeeping mission during Hezbollah–Israel conflict (2006–present): International incidents during the 2006 Lebanon War; 2024 Israeli invasion of Lebanon; Israeli attack on Ramyah UNIFIL post; Part of Israeli–Lebanese conflict; Location: Middle East (Southern Lebanon)	UNIFIL	Israel Hezbollah	Ongoing
Operation Atalanta (2008–): Attack on Spanish oiler Patiño; Tribal Kat Operation; Part of counter-piracy efforts off the Horn of Africa	European Union (European Union Training Mission in Somalia) Non EU: Colombia; Iceland; Liechtenstein; Montenegro; New Zealand; Norway; Serbia; Switzerland; United Kingdom	Somali pirates	Ongoing
Libyan intervention (2011): Operation Unified Protector; Part of Libyan Civil War; Location: North Africa, Libya	Many NATO members acting under (United Nations) UN mandate and (Libya) Anti-Gaddafi forces several Arab League states Sweden	(Libya) Pro-Gaddafi forces	Victory: Fall of Gaddafi regime; Muammar Gaddafi killed; National Transitional Council take control
2012 Peñón de Vélez de la Gomera incident (2012) Location: North Africa, Peñón de Vélez de la Gomera	Spain	Morocco	Victory: Moroccan activists arrested
2021 Morocco–Spain border incident (2021) Location: North Africa, Morocco–Spain border	Spain	Morocco	Inconclusive
2026 Ceuta migrant crisis (2026) Location: North Africa, Ceuta and Melilla	Spain	Morocco	Ongoing

== See also ==
- List of wars involving ancient and medieval Spain
- Military history of Spain
- List of Spanish colonial wars in Morocco
- Anglo-Spanish War (disambiguation)
  - Babington Plot
  - Ridolfi plot
  - Throckmorton Plot
  - Main Plot
  - Gunpowder Plot
  - Atterbury Plot
  - Armada of 1779
- Franco-Spanish War (disambiguation)
  - Journée des Dupes
  - Cinq-Mars conspiracy
  - Latréaumont's conspiracy
  - Cellamare conspiracy
- Spanish–Portuguese War (disambiguation)
- Spanish–Ottoman wars
- Ottoman-Habsburg Wars
- Empresa de China
- Attempted coups d'état in Spain
- Spain during World War II
  - Operation Felix
  - Operation Isabella
  - Operation Pilgrim
  - Operation Cisneros
- Contemporary history of Spain
