= Igawawen =

Ethnic group

Zwawa
Igawawen

Languages
- Kabyle, Algerian Arabic

Religion
- Islam

Related ethnic groups
- Chaouis, Mozabites, Shilha, Tuaregs, Chenouas, Rifians

Igawawen or Gawawa, mostly known as Zwawa (in Kabyle: Igawawen, in Arabic: زواوة, and in Latin: Jubaleni) were a group of Kabyle tribes inhabiting the Djurdjura mountains, Greater Kabylia, in Algeria. The Zouaoua are a branch of the Kutama tribe of the Baranis Berbers.

In the most restricted sense, the Igawawen were a confederation (kabyle: taqbilt, derived from Arabic "قبيلة" meaning tribe) of 8 tribes split into two groups:

- Ait Betrun: Ait Yenni, At Wasif, Ait Budrar, Ait Bu Akkash.
- Ait Mengellet: Ait Mengellet proper, Ait Aqbil, Ait Attaf, Ait Bu Yusef.

== Etymology ==
"Zwawa" was the Arabic name of medieval Muslim historians for the tribes who inhabited the region between Béjaïa and Dellys. Some say that it's a deformation of the word "Igawawen", which was the name of a Kabyle confederation made up of eight tribes organized into two groups: the Ait Betrun (Ait Yenni, At Wasif, Ait Budrar, Ait Bu Akkash), and the Ait Mengellet (Ait Mengellet proper, Ait Aqbil, Ait Attaf, Ait Bu Yusef), and used as pars pro toto by the Kabyles of Lesser Kabylia to refer to Greater Kabylia. They were named after the mountain they occupy, the Agawa mountain, the most densely populated, in the north of Djurdjura.

Kabyles do not refer to themselves in their language as Zwawa, and it is no longer used in Algerian Arabic either, except in western Algeria, where Kabyles are still called Zwawa.

Zwawa was also a personal name. In the 9th century, one of the chiefs of the Huwwara Berber tribe, who took part in the Muslim conquest of Sicily, was called Zwawa ibn Neam al-Half, who assisted in the triumph of the Muslim armies against the Byzantines.

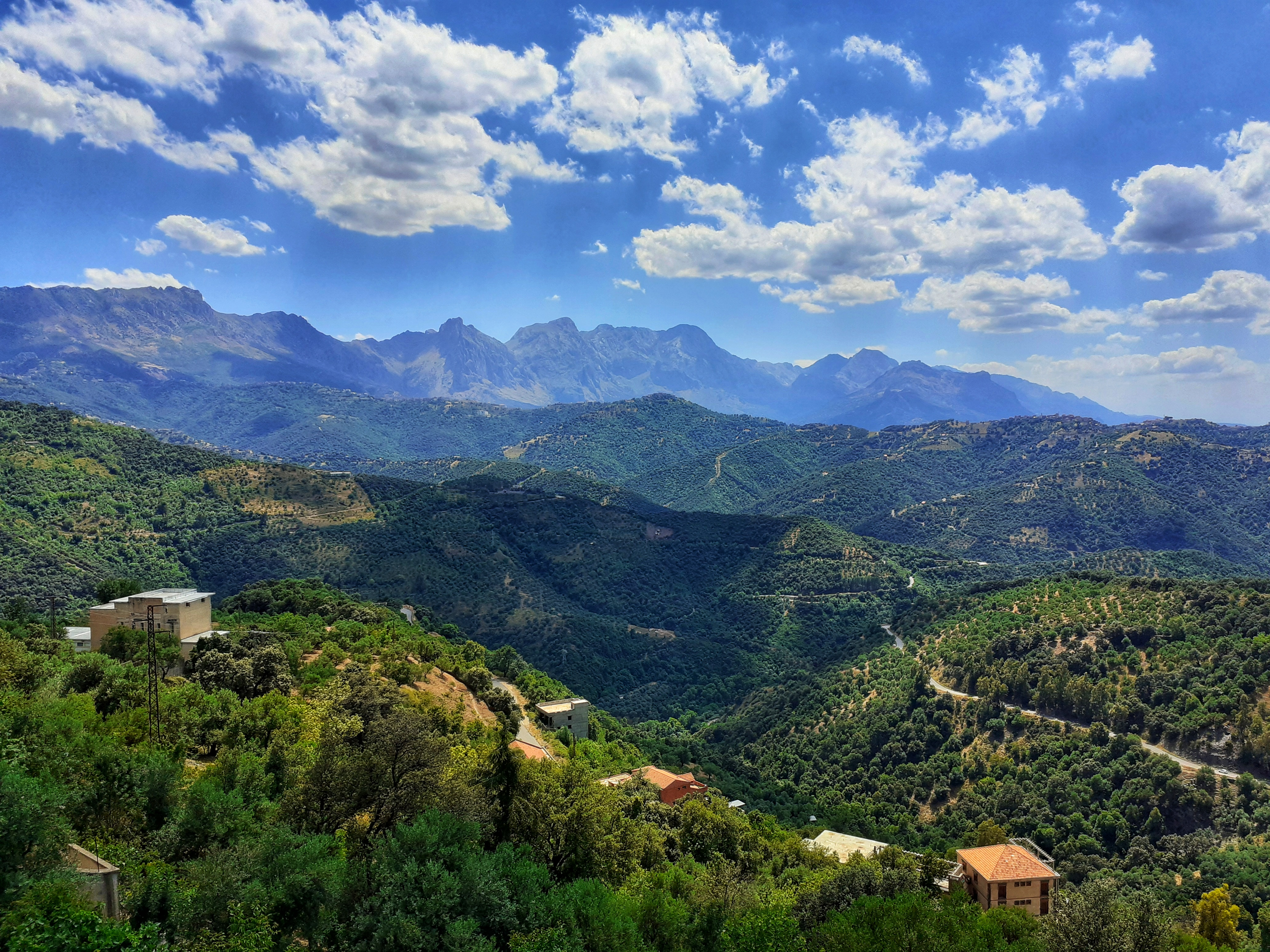
Landscape of the Djurdjura, homeland of the Igawawen.

Ibn Hawqal in the 10th century, was the first Muslim traveler and geographer to mention the name in his book, ZwawaKitab al-Masâlik wa l-Mamâlik, but without giving substantial information about them.

Adolphe Hanoteau, a 19th-century French general, thought that the word Zwawa might be an alteration of "Ath Wawa", the regular plural of Agawa (son of Awa), used to designate a man from the Igawawen, by replacing the Kabyle "th" with "z".

During the time of the Regency of Algiers, the Kabyles were considered such excellent infantrymen that the name "Zwawi" became synonymous with "infantryman". The various factions of the Titteri tribes provided a certain number of infantrymen who at times guarded Algiers and especially the surrounding bordjs (plural of fortress). They were only paid during active service. It was also said about them: "The Zwawa are in front for misery, behind for pay."

== Origins ==
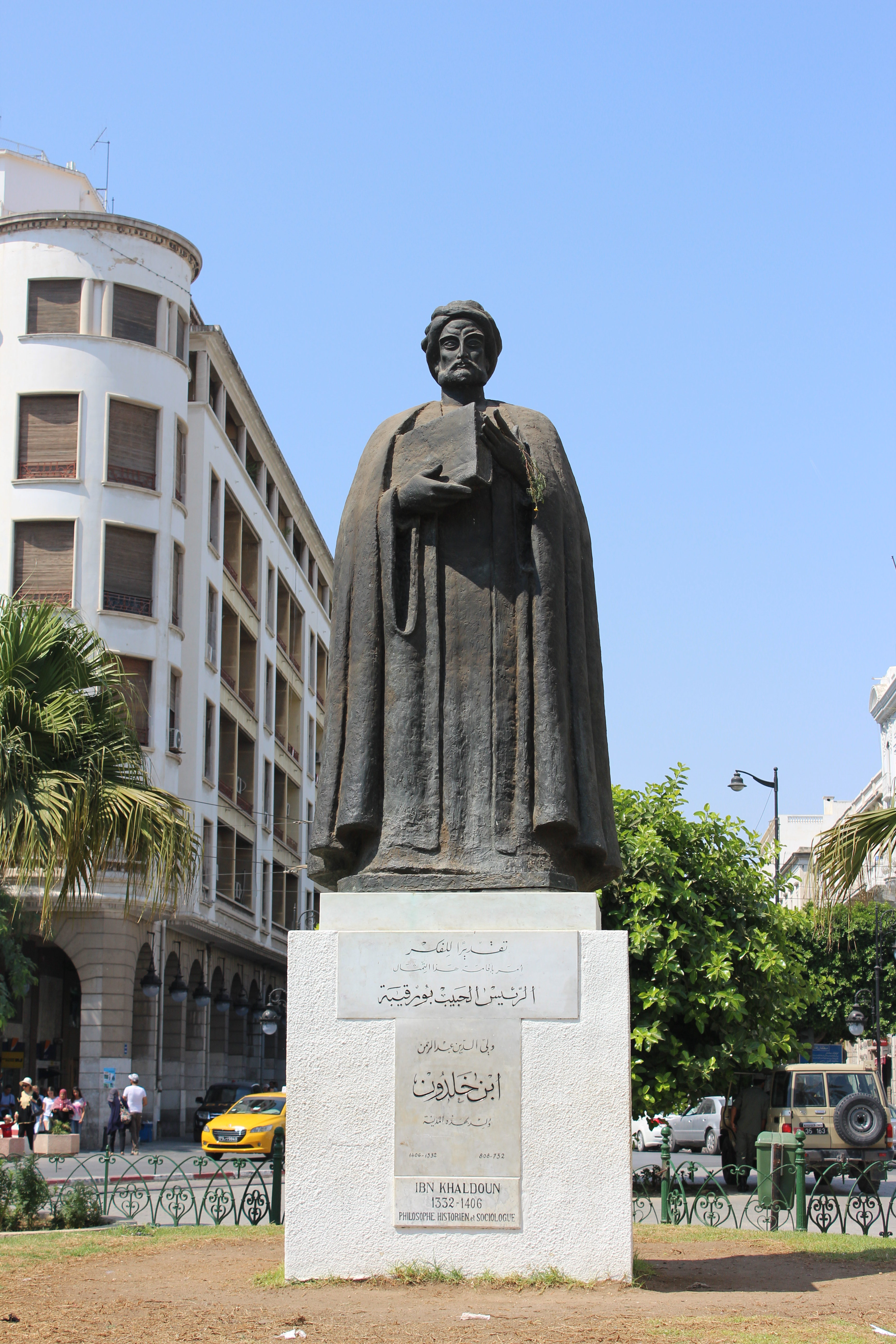
Statue of Ibn Khaldun in Tunis.

The earliest source, al-Qāḍī al-Nuʿmān, the official historian of the Fatimids, explicitly lists the Zwawa among the tribes of the Kutama confederation in his work Iftitāḥ al-daʿwa. This contemporary account integrates them within the Kutama during the Fatimid expansion.

The Andalusian genealogist Ibn Hazm also considers them a branch of the Kutama.

Ibn Khaldun reports that, according to Berber genealogists, the Zwawa and Zwagha descend from the stock of El-Abter and consider themselves linked to the Zenata by blood :

"The Zwawa and the Zwagha, tribes from the Berber stock of al-Abter, are the children of Semgan, son of Yahya (or Yedder), son of Dari, son of Zeddjik (or Zahhik), son of Madghis al-Abter. Of all the Berber tribes, their closest relatives are the Zenata, since Djana, the ancestor of this people, was Semgan's brother and Yahya's (Yedder's) son. It is for this reason that the Zwawa and the Zwagha consider themselves related to the Zenata by blood."

However, Ibn Khaldun also notes that Ibn Hazm attaches the Zwawa to the tribe of Kutama, and he acknowledges that the proximity of their territory to that of the Ketama, as well as their cooperation in supporting Ubayd Allah (founder of the Fatimid dynasty), is strong evidence in favor of this opinion.

== History ==
=== High Middle Ages ===
The Kutama, including the Zwawa, like all the other Berber tribes, participated in the conquest of the Iberian Peninsula. There are also several toponyms in Spain that derive their origins from Berber tribes settled in the region, such as Atzueva (At Zwawa), which can even mean that the Berber language was spoken there, because of the preservation of the Berber prefix for the parentage "Ath" instead of the Arabic "Beni". There are other toponyms too, such as Azuébar (Assuévar in Catalan), which comes from Zwawa. Without forgetting Algatocin (Atouch, confederation of Aït Waguenun) and Benicàssim, which may have been an extinct fraction of the Zwawa. These Beni Qasim even founded a taifa after the collapse of the Umayyad Caliphate of Cordoba, the Taifa of Alpuente.

3 of the 47 clan toponyms identified in the Balearic Islands, which were conquered by Muslims in the 10th century, 12th century and 13th centuries, refer to tribes belonging to the Zwawa, these three toponyms are : Beniatron, which is a variant of the name of the Aït Betrun confederation. Ibn Khaldun had mentioned the Aït Betrun in the same form. The second toponym is Artana, which may refer to the Aït Iraten confederation. The third is Benicassim.

The Zwawa were always traditional allies of the Kutama, perhaps even because they are themselves Kutama as Ibn Hazm and Ibn Khaldun claimed, even though they were mentioned separately in the historical records. In the tenth century, the tribes of the Baranis group of modern central Algeria, such as the Sanhaja, the Kutama, and the Zwawa, played a fundamental role in the creation of the Fatimid Caliphate by constituting the Army of the empire that had conquered most of the Maghreb, Sicily, Egypt, the Levant, and the Hejaz. The Zwawa participated in several battles for the Fatimid Caliphate, alongside their neighbors and blood brothers, notably in the siege of the fortress of Kiana (in the vicinity of the Qalaa of the Beni Hammad) against Abu Yazid, in which the Fatimids succeeded in taking the fortress and defeating the Zenati Kharijites and Nekkarites.

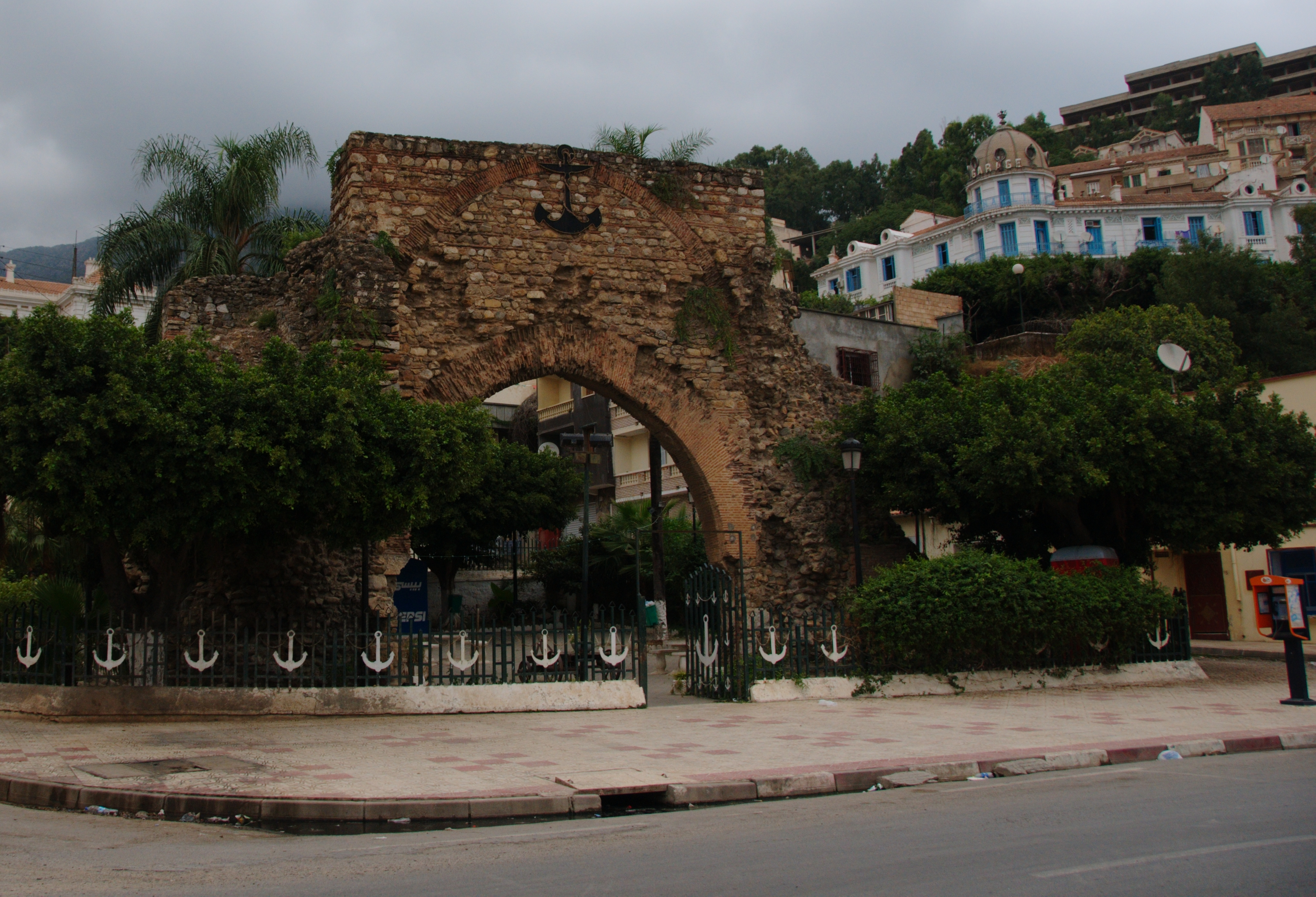
The golden gate in Bejaia, built by the Hammadids.

In the year 972, the Zwawa came under the control of the Zirids, Sanhaja Berbers whose ancestor was Ziri Ibn Menad al-Sanhaji, who ruled over "Al-Maghrib al-Awsat" (central Maghreb, modern Algeria) and Ifriqya, also called "Al-Maghrib al-Adna" ("he closest Maghreb" to the East, modern day Tunisia), in the name of the Fatimids after their departure for Cairo. After the split of the Zirid dynasty into two branches in the beginning of the 11th century, the Badicids (descendants of Badis, son of al-Mansur, son of Buluggin, son of Ziri) reigned over Ifriqya from Kairouan, and the Hammadites (descendants of Hammad, son of Buluggin) who reigned over the central Maghreb from the Kaala des Beni Hammad, then Bejaia. The Zwawa were forced to make their submission, and the city of Bejaia was built on their territory. The Zwawa often rebelled against the Hammadids, because they were reassured and had nothing to fear in their mountains.

=== Almohad and Hafsid periods ===
Bejaia was conquered by the Almohad Berbers, who succeeded in unifying the Maghreb under the great Caliph, Abd al-Mumin Ibn Ali, in 1159. During the period of weakness of the Almohad Caliphate in the 13th century, three dynasties took over power: the Hafsids of the Masmuda tribe who controlled Ifriqya, from Tripoli to Bejaia, and their capital was Tunis; the Zayyanids, also called "Abdalwadids" (or "Beni Abdelwad"), Zenata who controlled the central Maghreb and had Tlemcen as their capital; finally, the Marinids, Zenata from the same branch as the Zayyanids (Beni Wasin), and they controlled Al-Maghrib al-Aqsa ("The extreme Maghreb", i.e. Morocco), and had Fez as their capital.

Ibn Khaldun, who was the only historian of the Middle Ages to give important information about the Zwawa, lived in this period, and precisely in the 14th century. He mentioned the Zwawa as a numerous Berber people, and he gave a list of the tribes belonging to the Zwawa:

"According to Berber genealogists, the Zwawa are divided into several branches such as the Medjesta, the Melikesh, the Beni Koufi, the Mesheddala, the Beni Zericof, the Beni Guzit, the Keresfina, the Uzeldja, the Mudja, the Zeglawa and the Beni Merana. Some people say, and perhaps rightly, that the Melikech belong to the race of the Sanhaja."

In this list, most of the mentioned tribes are not known to anyone, they probably disappeared or were absorbed by other tribes due to various reasons, including civil wars, as was the case with two tribes, the Isemmadien who once belonged to the Aït Iraten, and the Aït U-Belqasem tribe, which was part of the Aït Betrun confederation at least before the middle of the 18th century. This shows how erroneous the claim of common ancestry is. The claim of common ancestry is very difficult to accept everywhere else, is even less acceptable in Kabylia, where the tribe is a political federation which changes over time and at the will of the confederates. The only tribes that still exist in this first list are three: The Aït Melikech of the Wad Sahel (Soummam), the Beni Koufi of the Guechtoula, and finally, the Mesheddala, neighbors of the Aït Betrun. The Beni Koufi belong to the Guechtoula, but apparently, they were mentioned separately in the list. Here are the tribes of the second list cited by Ibn Khaldun :

"Today, the most prominent Zwawa tribes are the Beni Idjer, the Beni Mengellet, the Beni Itrun (Beni Betrun), the Beni Yenni, the Beni Bou-Ghardan, the Beni Ituragh, the Beni Bu Yusef, the Beni Chayb, the Beni Aissi, the Beni Sedqa, the Beni Ghubrin and the Beni Gechtoula."

The Aït Iraten and the Aït Frawsen, Zwawian tribes, were also mentioned on the same page, but not in this list. Moreover, Ibn Khaldun mentioned the Ait Yenni separately from the Ait Betrun, while they belong to the latter. Same thing for the Ait Bu Yusef, who were mentioned separately from the Aït Mengellat, while they are part of the latter. However, some tribes considered as Zwawa, in the less restricted sense, were not mentioned here, such as the Aït Yahya, the Illilten and the Aït Khelili. Here is what Ibn Khaldun said about the Zwawa:

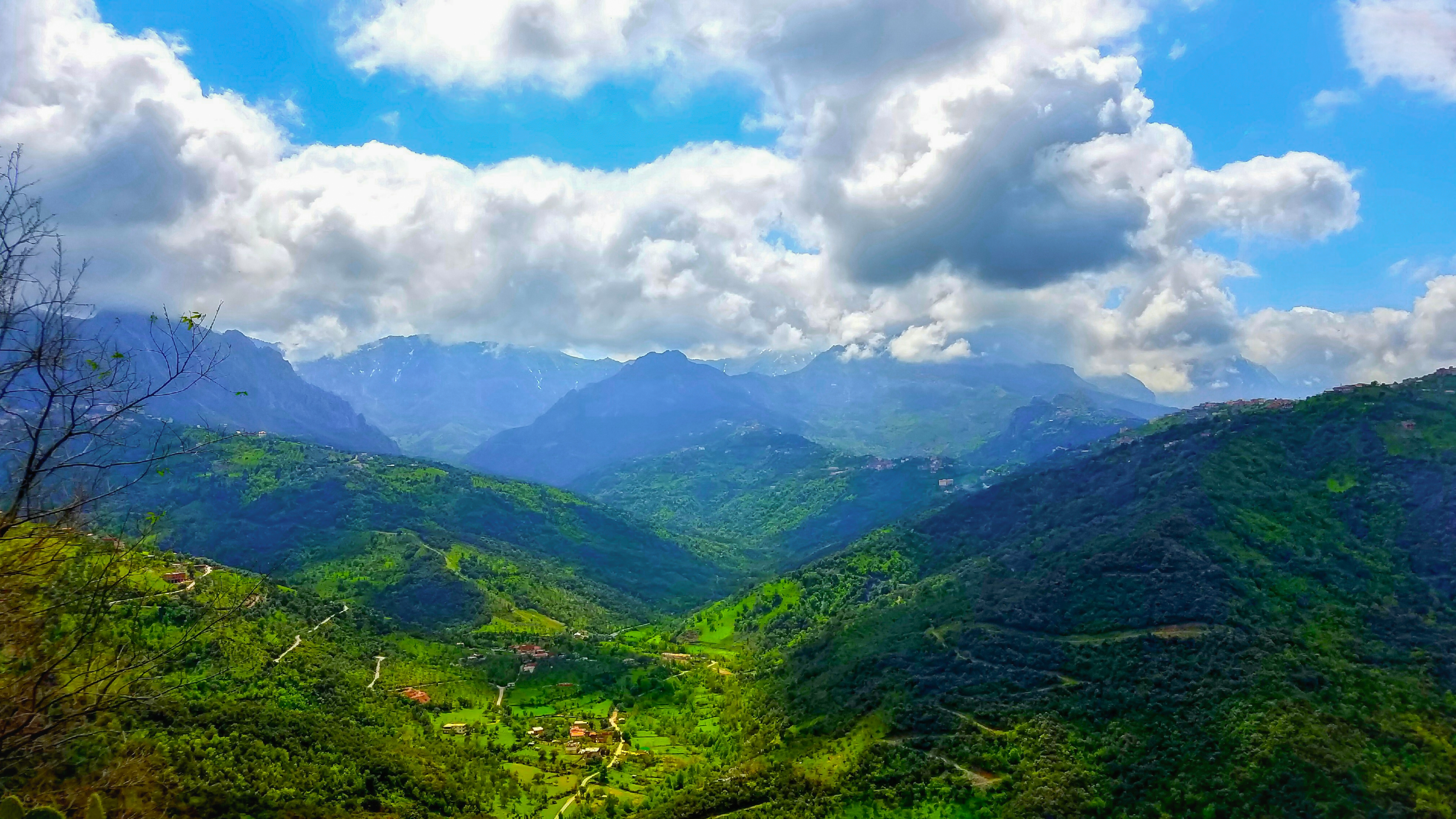
The Djurdjura during the spring.

"The territory of the Zwawa is located in the province of Bejaia and separates the country of the Kutama from that of the Sanhaja. They live in the midst of precipices formed by mountains so high that the view is dazzled, and so wooded that a traveler cannot find his way there. This is how the Beni Ghubrin inhabit the Ziri, a mountain also called Djebel ez-Zan, because of the large quantity of zean oaks with which it is covered, and the Beni Frawen and the Beni Iraten occupy the one located between Bejaia and Dellys. This last mountain is one of their most difficult retreats to tackle and the easiest to defend; from there they brave the power of the government (of Bejaia), and they pay tax only when it suits them. they stand on this lofty peak and challenge the forces of the Sultan, although they still recognize its authority. Their name is even registered in the registers of the administration as a tribe subject to tax (kharadj)."

In the 14th century, the Marinid Berbers launched an expedition into the territory of the Abdelwadids of Tlemcen and the Hafsids of Tunis with the aim of unifying the Maghreb, as their predecessors, the Almohads, did. In the year 1338 (or 1339), the 10th Marinid Sultan, Abu al-Hassan, had camped with his army in Mitidja, not far from Algiers, after his successful military campaign against the Kingdom of Tlemcen. One of his sons, Abu Abdulrahman Ya'qub, fled, was arrested and died shortly thereafter. After this event, a butcher from the Sultan's kitchen, who looked a lot like Abu Abdulrahman Yacoub, went to the Aït Iraten. When he reached the tribe's territory, Chimsi, a woman of the noble family of the Abd al-Samed, hastened to grant him protection and urged the whole tribe to recognize the authority of the pretender and to assist him against the sultan. So, the latter offered considerable sums to the sons of Chimsi and to the people of the tribe, in order to have the pretender delivered. Chimsi initially rejected this proposal, but having subsequently discovered that she had supported an impostor, she withdrew her protection and sent him back to the country occupied by the Arabs. Then she went to appear before the Sultan with a deputation made up of some of her sons and several notables of her tribe. The Marinid monarch, Abu al-Hassan Ibn Uthman, gave her the most honorable welcome, and having showered her with gifts and those who had accompanied her. The Abd al-Samed family still retained command of the tribe.

During the Almohad period, and especially Hafsid, there were many mentions of great scholars from the Zwawa, such as Abu Zakariya Yahya ez-Zwawi, better known under the name of Ibn Mu'ṭi, philologist from the Hesnawa tribe, confederation of the Ait Aissi, author of the first versified grammatical work, the Alfiyya. He also wrote several works on various subjects; Abu Ali Nacer ed-Din ez-Zwawi, from the Meshedalla, great doctor of Bejaia; Amrane al-Medhedalli, also from the Meshedalla, professor of law; Abu r-Ruḥ 'Isa al-Mengellati, from the Aït Mengellat; Omar Ibn 'Ali from the Aït Melikesh; Abu el-'Abbas from the Aït Ghubri, and many other scholars from various Zwawian tribes. The French historian, Robert Brunschvig (1901 - 1990), had said in his book, La Berbérie Orientale sous les Hafsides, volume 1, that the nisbas formed on Meshedalla, Melikesh, Mengellat, Ghubri(n) are numerous in the texts from the Hafsid period.

The Zwawa were also present in Mamluk Egypt were they held prominent positions in the Mamluk court.

=== Ottoman-Algerine period ===
==== Under the Kingdom of Kuku ====
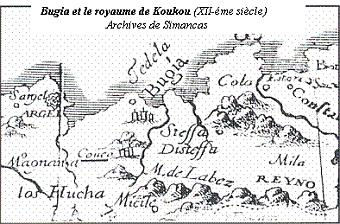
16th century Spanish map depicting Kabylia, including Couco (Koukou) and Labez (Fort of the Beni Abbas).

After the capture of Bejaia by the Spanish in the year 1510, a certain Sidi Ahmed U-Lqadi, descendant of the judge of Bejaia, Abu el-'Abbas el-Ghubrini, took refuge in the village of his ancestors, Awrir (commune of Ifigha) of the Aït Ghubri tribe, and will found a state which will include Great Kabylia, which is the Kingdom of Kuku, whose capital was his village of origin, then Koukou among the Aït Yahya in 1515, because of its strategic position and its geopolitical advantages that no other village had. Sidi Ahmed or el-Kadi came from a literate and educated family, which had been well established in Bejaia, and had long served the Hafsid sultans.

In Spanish documents, the Kingdom of Kuku was often referred to as "Reino de Azuagos", meaning the Kingdom of the Zwawa. But the French anthropologist, Émile Masqueray supports the idea that the Aït Ulqadi reigned only over the valley of Wad Sebaou and part of eastern Great Kabylia. Émile Masqueray says about Sidi Ahmed el-Kadi:

"The precise witnesses of the natives limit the domination of the Lord of Kuku to the Wad Boubehir and Wad of the Amrawa. His influence undoubtedly extended much further; but, despite his musketeers and his cavalry, he was never master the mountain of Gawawa."

There is also no evidence that the Aït Ulqadi levied taxes on the central tribes of Djurdjura, such as the Aït Betrun, the Aït Iraten, and the Aït Mengellat, who were the strongest of the Zwawa in numbers, both weapons and manpower. According to Pierre Boyer, the territory of Kuku included the tribes of maritime Kabylia, and also those of the Aït Iraten and the Zwawa proper (the Aït Betrun and the Aït Mengellat), but these last were rather allies than submitted tribes. It should not be forgotten that the Zwawa, in the less restrictive sense of the term, are various confederations and tribes, and not a single united confederation, even if they speak the same language, have the same culture, and the same religion, and despite this, they were often allies to deal with foreign invasions, as in 1849 against the French, but also in 1830, 1857, and 1871 against the same enemy.

While the Spaniards had control over some ports in the Maghreb, the Turks and the Kabyles supported each other against the Christian invaders, especially in the attempt to retake Béjaïa in 1512, where the Kabyles numbered 20,000 in the battlefield, but failed to retake the city. Nevertheless, the Kabyles under Sidi Ahmed and Arudj Reis captured Jijel in 1514, Cherchell and Algiers in 1516, defeated the Spanish-Arab forces at Oued Djer in 1517 and participated in the Fall of Tlemcen in 1518. They also participated in the Capture of the Peñon of Algiers in 1530 and it was their efforts that secured the conquest of the whole country.

The relationship between Sidi Ahmed Ulkadi and the Barberossa brothers (Aruj and Khayr ad-Din) deteriorated because of the assassination of Salim at-Tumi, leader of the Thaaliba who controlled Algiers, by the Barberossa brothers in 1516 for their own interest. Perhaps it is for this reason that Sidi Ahmed Ulkadi had abandoned Aruj Barbarossa the year after, during the battle of Tlemcen, in which the Ottomans were defeated and Ziyyanid Sultan, Abu Hammou III, had been restored on the throne as a vassal of the Spanish Empire. The regency of Algiers had therefore lost its most important kabyle allies. After this event, war with Aruj's brother, Kheireddine Barberossa, was inevitable. The following year, the Kabyles, supported by the Hafsids of Tunis, confronted the Ottomans for the first time in the Battle of Issers, on the territory of the Aït Aicha tribe (province of Boumerdès). The Kabyles inflicted heavy losses on the Ottomans and emerged victorious. The way for Algiers became open, they seized the city the following year and Sidi Ahmed Ulkadi became Master of Kuku and Algiers, and therefore controlled the Mitidja. Khayr ad-Din took refuge in Jijel after his defeat against the Kabyles, and he had captured Bona, Collo and Constantine and received the allegiance of many tribes in the region, although he failed to liberate all of Algeria. After five or even seven years, but more likely five, Sidi Ahmed Ulkadi was assassinated, and Khayr ad-Din had recaptured Algiers.

The history of the Kingdom of Kuku did not end there, although the kingdom was weakened. Sidi Ahmed el-Kadi was replaced by his brother, el-Hussein, and Great Kabylia had kept its independence. In the year 1529, that is to say two or four years after the capture of Algiers by Khayr ed-Din, a peace treaty was concluded by the Aït Ulkadi and the Regency of Algiers, the latter recognizing the undisputed master of the independent Great Kabylia, el-Hussein, but also imposing an annual tax, which has never been paid. Ammar Boulifa says about this:

"The non-execution of this part of the agreement signed with the Turks is not surprising, because the Bel-K'adhi (Aït Ulkadi), who refused to pay this tax, only followed and respect the traditions of their country."

The Spanish historian, Diego de Haëdo, in his work, History of the Kings of Algiers, which was published in 1612, wrote about the Zwawa, which he called "Azuagos" or "Mores de Kouko", and he also wrote about the Kingdom of Kuku, whose king was cited as a powerful ruler. De Haëdo had said that the Zwawa were very numerous, that they only came and went back, buying weapons, roaming freely in Algiers, as if the city was theirs.

In 1555, a new attempt was made to capture Bejaia, in which a large force of the Zwawa had participated to retake the city in the capture of Bejaia, which ultimately ended in success, and the Spanish were driven out of the city.

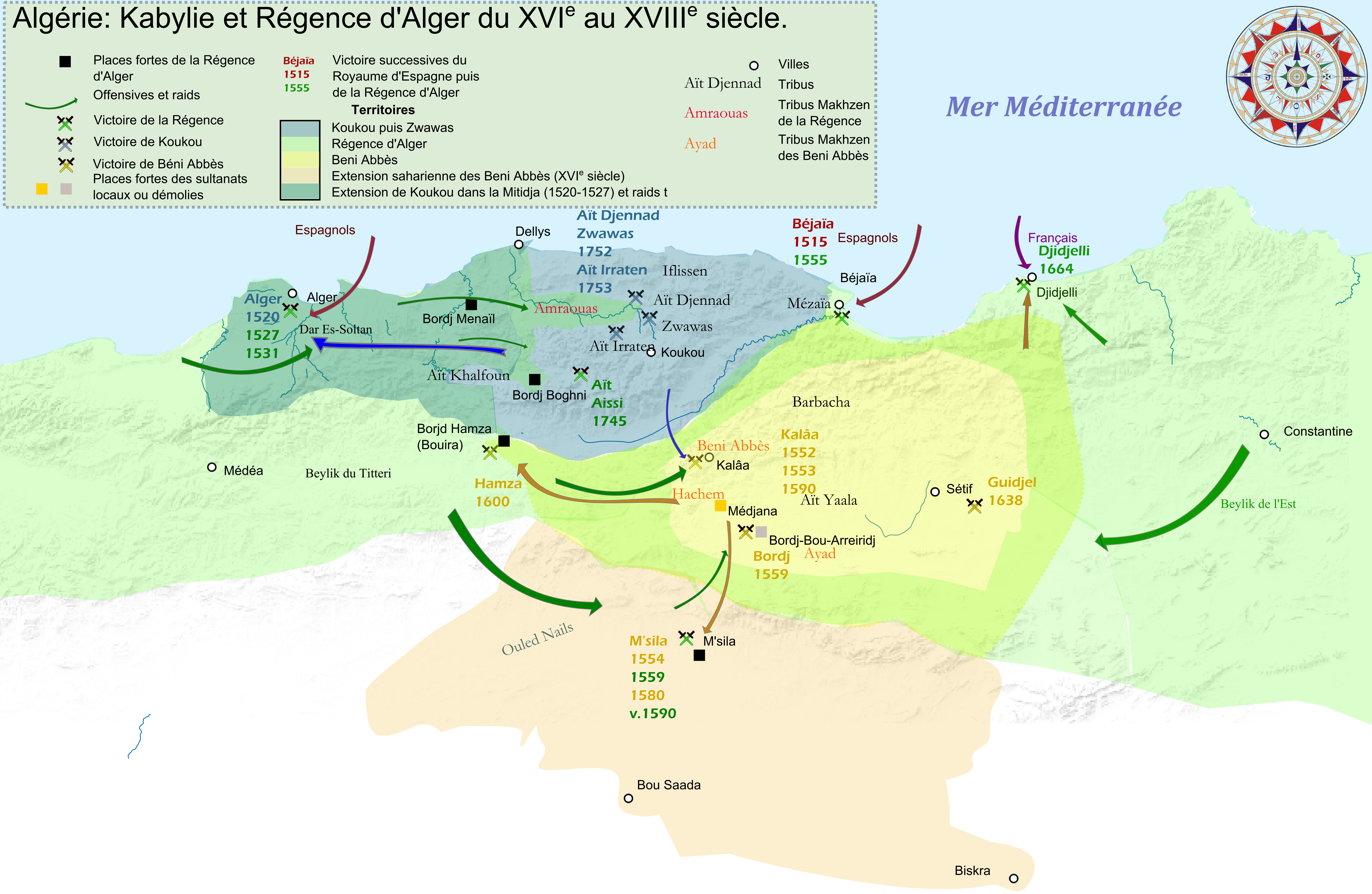
The battles that happened between the Kabyles and the Regency of Algiers from the 16th century till the 18th.

In 1569 they made up the bulk of the forces that captured Tunis from the Spanish. In 1576, 1,000 Zwawa participated in the capture of Fez in Morocco as allies of the Regency of Algiers, in which they supported the future Saadian sultan, Abu Marwan Abd al-Malik, against his nephew, Muhammad al-Mutawakkil. The Zwawa were equipped with muskets, and they were noted to be good soldiers. Muhammad al-Mutawakkil was defeated. 4,000 Zwawa made up the bulk of the second line of Abd al-Malik's forces in the Battle of Alcácer Quibir, this contingent was the best among his forces on the field. It was a heavy shot charge by the Zwawa and the renegades that was said to have been the primary cause of the Portuguese defeat in the battle.

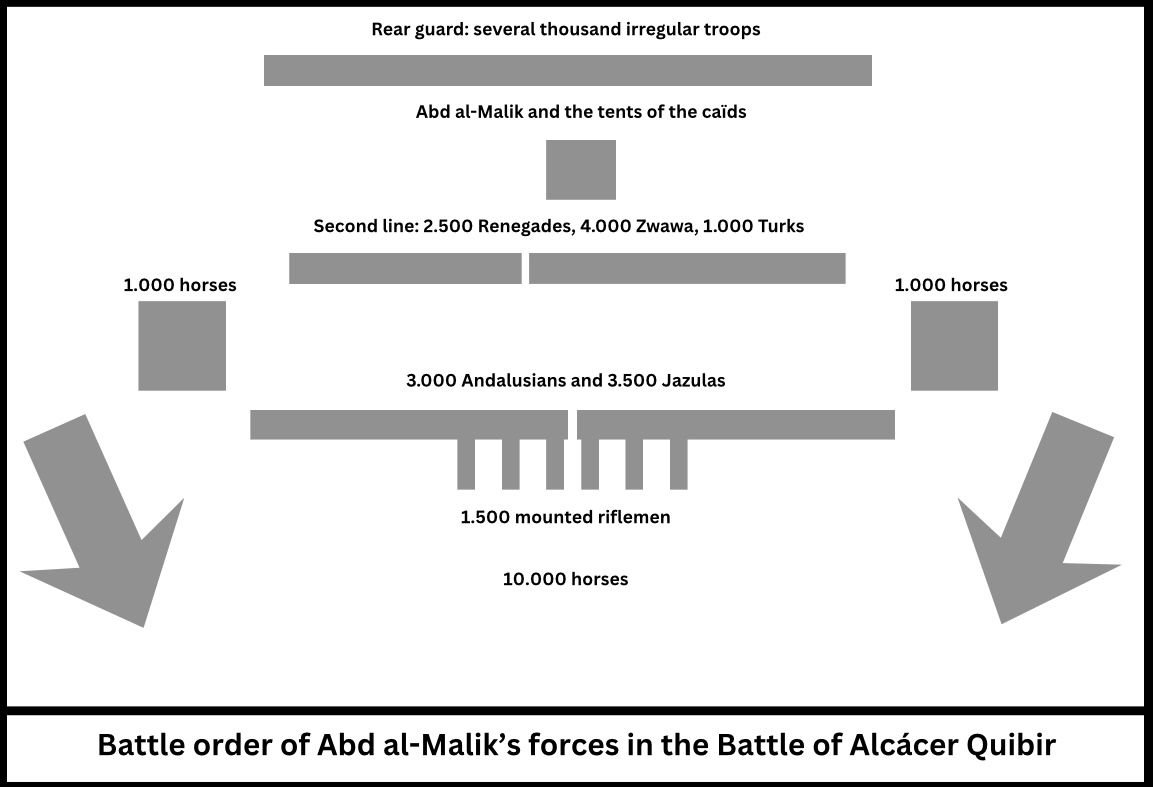
Battle order of Abd al-Malik's army in the Battle of Alcácer Quibir

In 1541, the Zouaoua supported Charles V in his Expedition to Algiers by sending 2000 men to his army. Hassan Pasha responded in 1542 by attacking and massacring the Zouaoua. In 1546, Amar had succeeded his father, el-Hussein, to the throne. Amar had reigned until his assassination in 1618, because of "tyranny" and his weakness against the Regency of Algiers who led two punitive expeditions, in 1607 in which they reached Jema'a n Saharij among the Aït Frawsen, and in 1610 when they had reached their capital, Kuku. Amar had been replaced by his brother, Mohammed. Amar's wife, who was pregnant, took refuge with her parents' family, the Hafsid family in Tunis, and gave birth to a boy, Ahmed. Ahmed was nicknamed "Boukhtouch", meaning the man with the javelin, and his full name was Sidi Ahmed et-Tunsi. In the 1630s, Sidi Ahmed returned to Kabylia with Hafsid troops from Tunis, then avenged his father's death, and took control of Great Kabylia.

Sidi Ahmed had left Kuku, and returned to the village of his ancestors, Awrir NAït Ghubri, then moved to Tifilkut among the Illilten tribe. This marked the end of Kuku as a political capital. However, the ruling family remained the same, but under a different name: Aït Boukhtouch, or Iboukhtouchen.

==== After the fall of Kuku ====
In the year 1659, the Algerine founded the caïdat (chiefdom) of bled Guechtula (or Boghni). The caïdat was under the authority of the Bey of Titteri, and the appointed caïds (chiefs) were all foreign to the tribe. The Guechtula confederation was forced to pay taxes. The Aït Sedqa (except the Aït Ahmed; Awqdal), part of the Aït Abdelmumen (Aït Aissi confederation) and the south of the Maatka tribe were part of it after their defeat against the Algerines years later.

In 1696, Great Kabylia had been divided into two çofs (parties) during a succession conflict between Ali, the legitimate heir to the throne, and his brother, Ourkho. Both were sons of Sidi Ahmed el-Tunsi. Here are the allegiances of the Kabyle tribes:

1. The party of Ourkho (çof oufella), made up of 38 tribes, most importantly: the Iflissen Umellil (fourteen tribes), At Mengellat (confederation of the same name), the Aït Wasif (Aït Betrun confederation), the Aït Djennad (four tribes), and finally, the Aït Yahya, who were the leaders of the çof.
2. The party of Ali (çof bouadda), who were 48 tribes, most importantly: the Aït Iraten (five tribes), the leaders of the çof, and the Amrawa, the Aït Idjer, the Aït Itsuragh, the Aït Aissi (four tribes), the Aït Yenni and the Aït Boudrar (both of the Aït Betrun confederation).

Ourkho disappeared from history, and his brother, Ali, emerged victorious.

At the beginning of the 18th century, a certain caïd, Ali Khodja, asserted his authority over the Amrawa, a powerful Kabyle tribe which would become a Makhzen tribe. He founded the caïdat de Sebaou and built a bordj (fortress) of the same name, halfway between Tizi Ouzou and bordj Menaïel, in 1720–21, then four years later, bordj-Boghni among the Guechtoula. Ali Khodja had defeated the Iboukhtouchen and their allies in Draâ Ben Khedda and among the Aït Frawsen. The caïdat du Sebaou included the Aït Khalfun, the Iflissen Umellil, the Beni Thur, the city of Dellys, the Aït Waguenun, the Iflissen Lebhar, the Aït Djennad, the Aït Ghubri, the tribes of High Sebaou and Assif el-Hammam, the Aït Aissi, the Aït Dwala, the Aït Zmenzer, the Betruna, the Aït Khelifa and part of the Maatka. The caïdat de Sebaou was, like the caïdat of Boghni, under the authority of the Bey of Titteri.

The populations of the mountain ranges of the Aït Iraten (Aït Akerma, the Aït Irdjen, the Agwacha, the Aït Umalu and the Aït Ussammer) and the Zwawa proper, that is to say the Aït Betroun (Aït Yenni, Aït Wasif, Aït Boudrar, the Aït Bou-Akkach, and the Aït Oubelkacem) and the Aït Mengellat (the Aït Mengellat proper, the Aqbil, the Aït Bou-Yousef, and the Aït Attaf), remained rebellious and were completely independent; they themselves appointed their leaders and paid no taxes to the Ottomans.

Thomas Shaw, a British traveller, had lived twelve years in the Regency of Algiers, from 1720 until 1732. Thomas Shaw mentioned the Zwawa as the most numerous and wealthy of the Berbers. They lived in Djurdjura, which is the highest mountain in Barbary. It is, from one end to the other, a chain of craggy rocks which serve as asylum for various Berber tribes, and preserve them from the domination of the Regency of Algiers. Thomas Shaw had cited the following Zwawi tribes (in order): the Boghni (confederation of Guechtula), the Guechtula, the Aït Kufi (confederation of Guechtula), the Aït Betrun, then the Aït Mengellat and the Aït Frawsen, and finally, the Aït Ghubri. He had cited Kuku as the most important of the Kabyle villages.

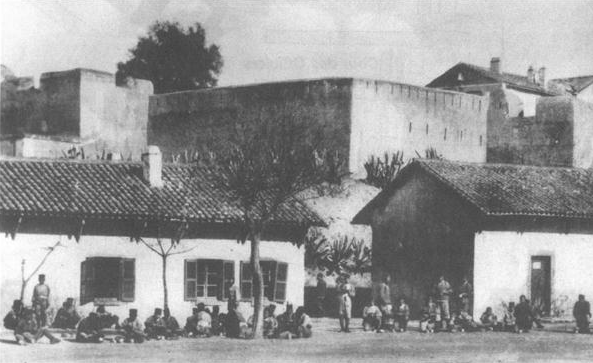
Bordj Tizi-Ouzou, built by the Bey Mohammed.

In the middle of the 18th century, the caïd of Sebaou, Mohammed Ben Ali, nicknamed "ed-Debbah" (meaning the slaughterer), was about to launch a campaign against the Aït Aïssi, the Ait Sedqa, and the Guechtula. Mohammed married the daughter of Si Ammar ou-Boukhetouch to conclude an alliance with his family and keep the tribes under their influence, like the Aït Iraten and the Aït Frawsen, neutral.

==== Serving under the Deylik of Algiers ====
In 1710, the Deylik of Algiers became De facto independent from the Sublime Porte.

In the 17th-18th century the Zwawas served as highly trained mercenaries in the armies of Algiers.

Zwawas were always a part of the Algerian army. Even in cases where some tribes were in rebellion, many other ones were still serving under the Dey of Algiers. Because of this, the relationship between the Deylikal government in Algiers, and the Zwawas was very much complicated.

During the late 18th and 19th century the Zwawas played an important role in the Algerian army, mainly as infantry.

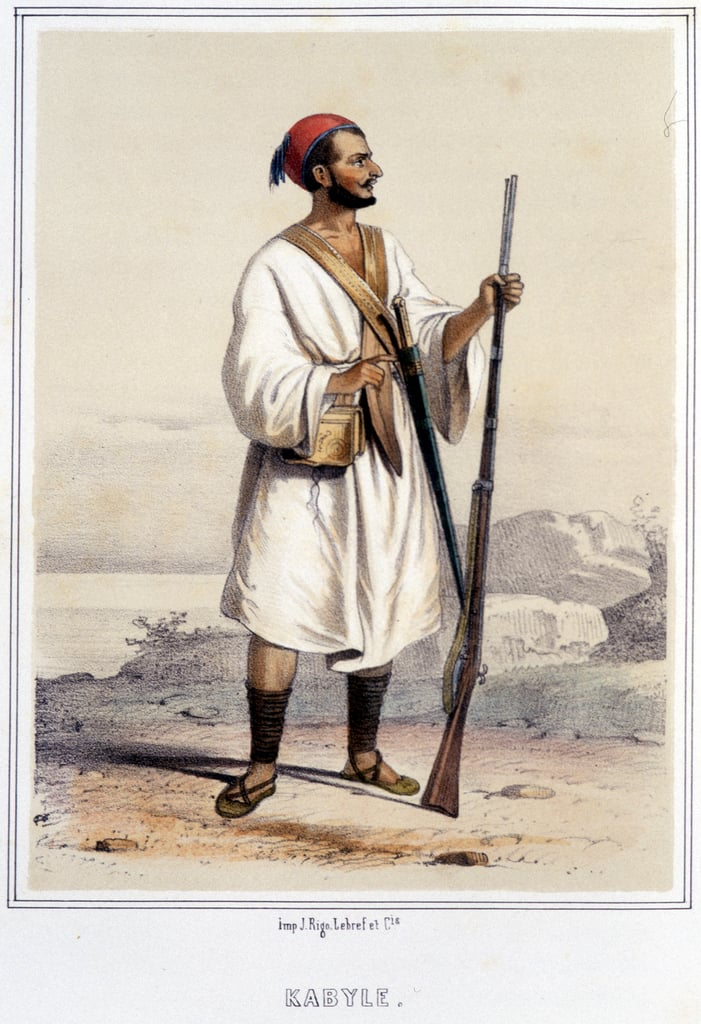
A Berber warrior with a musket.

In 1817 the freshly elected Dey of Algiers, Ali Khodja signed an alliance with the Zwawas, and elevated them to high positions, including the personal guard of the Dey. He defeated a Turkish Janissary rebellion with their help. This normalized the relationship between the Zwawas and the Dey.

Several Zwawa tribesmen, were also allowed into the Odjak of Algiers, serving as regular infantry. By 1828 about 2,000 Algerian men, mainly from the Zwawa tribes served as Janissairies.

In 1830 during the Invasion of Algiers by France, many Algerian troops were of Zwawa origins. Their heavy resistance and fighting capability during the Battle of Staouéli impressed the French, whom created a unit called the Zouaves to recruit Zwawas into the French army. As these recruitment campaigns were rather unsuccessful, they rebranded the unit.

==== Conflicts with the Deylik of Algiers ====
In 1745 that Mohammed Ben Ali led the Algerian troops, with Kabyles sent by the Zawia of Aït Sidi Ali Ou Moussa of the Maâtka, against the Aït Aïssi. Mohammed received the submission of the Aït Zmenzer, Aït Dwala and Iferdiwen tribes in a single day, but he met a fierce resistance from the villages of Taguemunt Azouz and Aït Khalfun of the Aït Mahmud, whom he was unable to defeat. Despite this, he was promoted to Bey of Titteri. The Bey then proceeded to crush the Guechtula and two tribes of the Aït Sedqa, the Aït Chenacha and the Aït Willul, successfully, and imposed light taxes. Then, he returned with his troops to the Aït Mahmud, captured Taguemount Azouz and Tizi Hibel, and finally received the submission of the entire tribe.

After one or two years, that is to say in 1746–47, Bey Mohammed Ben Ali launched an expedition against the Aït Wasif tribe of the Aït Betrun confederation (Zwawa proper), by passing through the Aït Sedqa, who were defeated some time before. He attempted to capture the tribe's market, « suq es-sebt », meaning the Saturday market (the market no longer exists). But this time, his fortune, which had always been favorable to him, turned against him, and the attempt ended in a deadly fiasco for the Ottomans, who were pushed back and forced to withdraw from the battle. The Ottomans have been defeated against the Ait Betrun, and will never again try to face the Zwawa proper with arms in hand. The Bey, desperate for his failure, tried a subterfuge to intimidate his opponents. He sent them a certain quantity of white bread, telling them that it was the daily food of his people. In response, the Kabyles sent him donuts sprinkled with this red pepper whose strength is proverbial, accompanying their sending with these words:

"These foods, covered with a strong layer of pepper that burns our blood when we eat them, rekindle our warlike ardor, our hatred for the foreigner and give us the necessary strength to exterminate them."

It was the Aït Betrun who set the example in the Djurdjura by defining the attitude to take against the ambition of the Regency of Algiers to subdue the region, and revolts broke out in the following years. Immediately after the victory of the Aït Betrun against the Algerines, their neighbors, the Aït Iraten, changed their allegiance and joined the anti-Algerine resistance. The same year, or maybe even one or two years later, the Aït Iraten held an assembly during which the marabouts of the confederation met in Tizra Waguemun and agreed to exheredate the women. The Aït Betrun, including the Aït Oubelkacem tribe which disappeared afterwards, did the same thing in 1749, in the territory of Aït Wasif, with their allies, the Aït Sedqa. Then the Aït Frawsen followed their example in a date posterior to 1752, in the largest village of the tribe, Djemâa Saharij. Here is a part of the version translated into French of the original manuscript in Arabic, in which are cited the new laws agreed by the marabouts of the Aït Betrun :

"Everyone complained of a damaging state of affairs, a source of discord, unrest and conflict in the villages, tribes and the confederation of Beni Betroun. The general assembly therefore pronounced unanimously:

1. to abolish the right of women to inherit;
2. to abolish the right of everyone (i.e. men as well as women) to exercise shefa'a, the right of pre-emption, in respect of property made over to a habus;
3. to abolish the right of daughters, sisters and orphans to participate in the exercise of the right of pre-emption – shefa'a – of any property;
4. to abolish the right of the wife who has been repudiated or widowed to have her dowry returned to her."

In 1753, the Iflissen Lebhar and the Aït Djennad broke out a revolt in maritime Kabylia, and after the Bey and the Aït Djennad had negotiated an arrangement, the Bey demanded only their absolute neutrality, and he gave up talking about taxes. The Bey turned his arms against the Aït Iraten. The Algerines were successful at first, inflicting casualties and penetrating the tribe's villages, but the Bey was killed by a bullet from one of his own soldiers, and the Algerines troops abandoned the attack, although they have not suffered serious losses.

In the year 1756, the Guechtula started a revolt in which the bordj-Boghni was destroyed and fell. The Guechtula drove out the garrison and killed the caïd Ahmed, but the bordj was rebuilt after the failure of the Kabyles in the attack on bordj-Bouira almost two months later. The bordj-Boghni was again destroyed by the Guechtula with the help of their neighbors, the Aït Sedqa, in 1818. The garrison had to capitulate after seven days of siege and the bordj remained several years in ruins, but was also rebuilt to once again.

== Tribes ==
The composition of the Zwawa seems to have changed over the course of history. In the Middle Ages, and more specifically in 14th century, Ibn Khaldun mentioned many tribes as being Zwawa, but during the French conquest, there were only two confederations being Zwawa, each made up of four tribes. According to Hugh Roberts, some tribes were more Zwawa than others, and the name "gawawen" has two meanings, a restricted and a less restricted one. The more restrictive meaning includes only Aït Betrun and Aït Mengellat, while the less restrictive meaning can include Aït Iraten, Aït Aissi, Aït Idjer, and many other tribes.

The next list will include the Zwawa confederations and tribes, with the numbers of rifles before the French conquest of each tribe, according to Charles Devaux. The numbers of inhabitants that will be shown are of 1872, given Adolphe Hanoteau.

Here are the confederations and tribes of the Zwawa:

=== Zwawa proper ===
The Zwawa proper were neighbors of Aït Iraten in the north, Aït Sedqa in the east, the Aït Itsuragh in the east and Mchedallah in the south. This confederation was made up of eight tribes organized into two groups:

- Aït Betrun: Aït Yenni, Aït Wasif, Aït Boudrar and Aït Bou Akkach, and the Aït Ubelqasem before. They had 4,545 rifles, the biggest number among all the Zwawa in the least restricted sense, and a population of 19,749, spread over 24 villages, and so it was also the most populous tribe. They called themselves "the heart of the Zwawa", they are fierce, and very rigid in the observation of their qanuns (laws). They were well known for their weapon industry, and also their jewelry. Among them there were good craftsmen whose art was more sophisticated.
- Aït Mengellat: Aït Mengellat properly said, Aqbil, Aït Bou Youcef, and Aït Aṭṭaf. They had 3,525 rifles, and a population of 14,429, spread over 29 villages. According to Émile Carrey, the Aït Mengellat tribe was one of the most warlike in all of Kabylia. Most of them were poor, but brave.

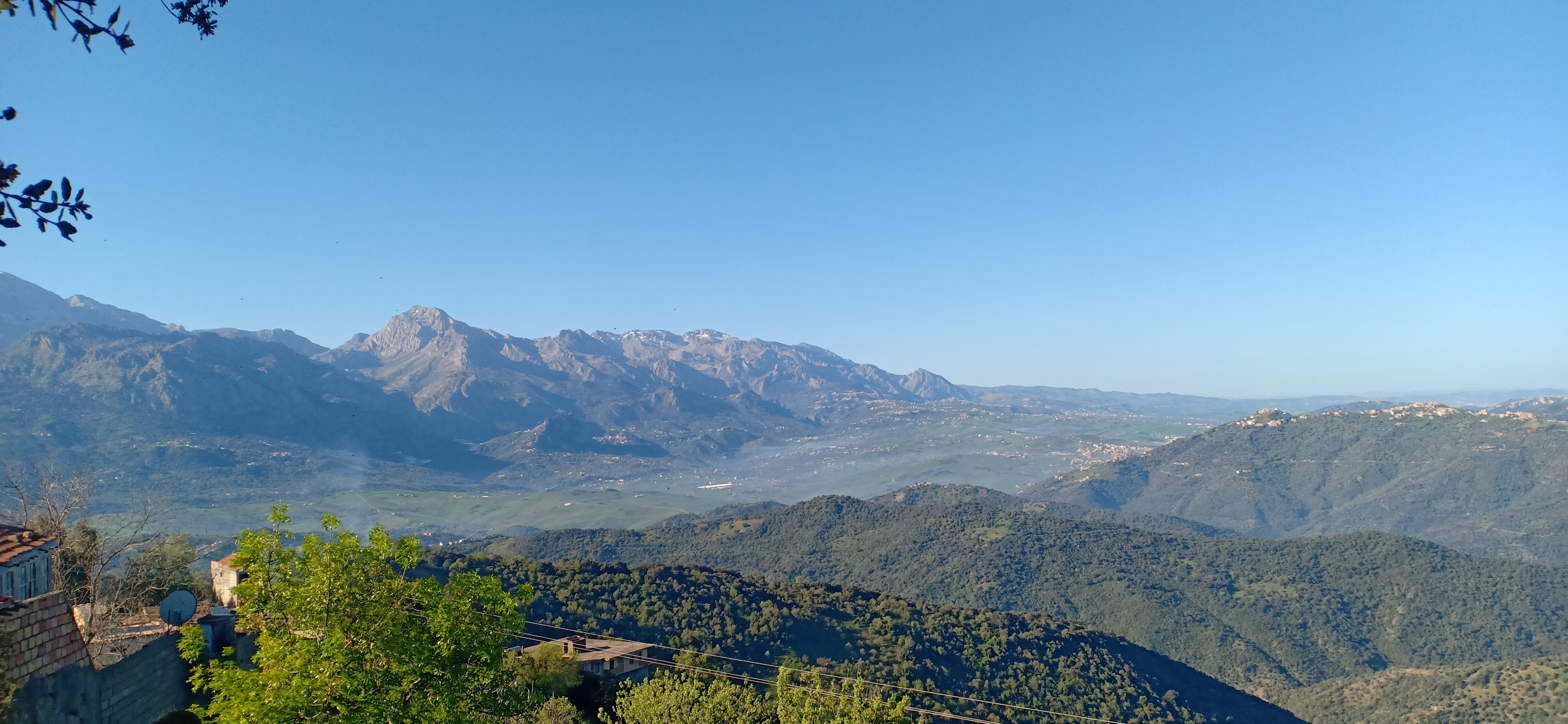
The Djurdjura seen from the Aït Yenni.

The total population of the Zwawa properly said was 34,178 inhabitants, spread over 53 villages. They had a total of 8,060 rifles strong before the French conquest. This confederation had the biggest number of rifles and population among all the Kabyles. They are the only Zwawa in the strictest sense of the term. This confederation never paid taxes to the Algiers, and always kept its independence until the French conquest of Kabylia in 1857. They were united and formed one confederation, and they always defended each other against foreigners, as it was the case in Algiers in the year 1830, where they united under one chief to defend the city against French invaders, and the war of 1857, in which the villages of the Aït Betrun were emptied of their men, who went to fight in Icheriden, alongside the Aït Mengellat, against the French.
