= Iferhounène =

Iferhounene Iferhunen
- Town
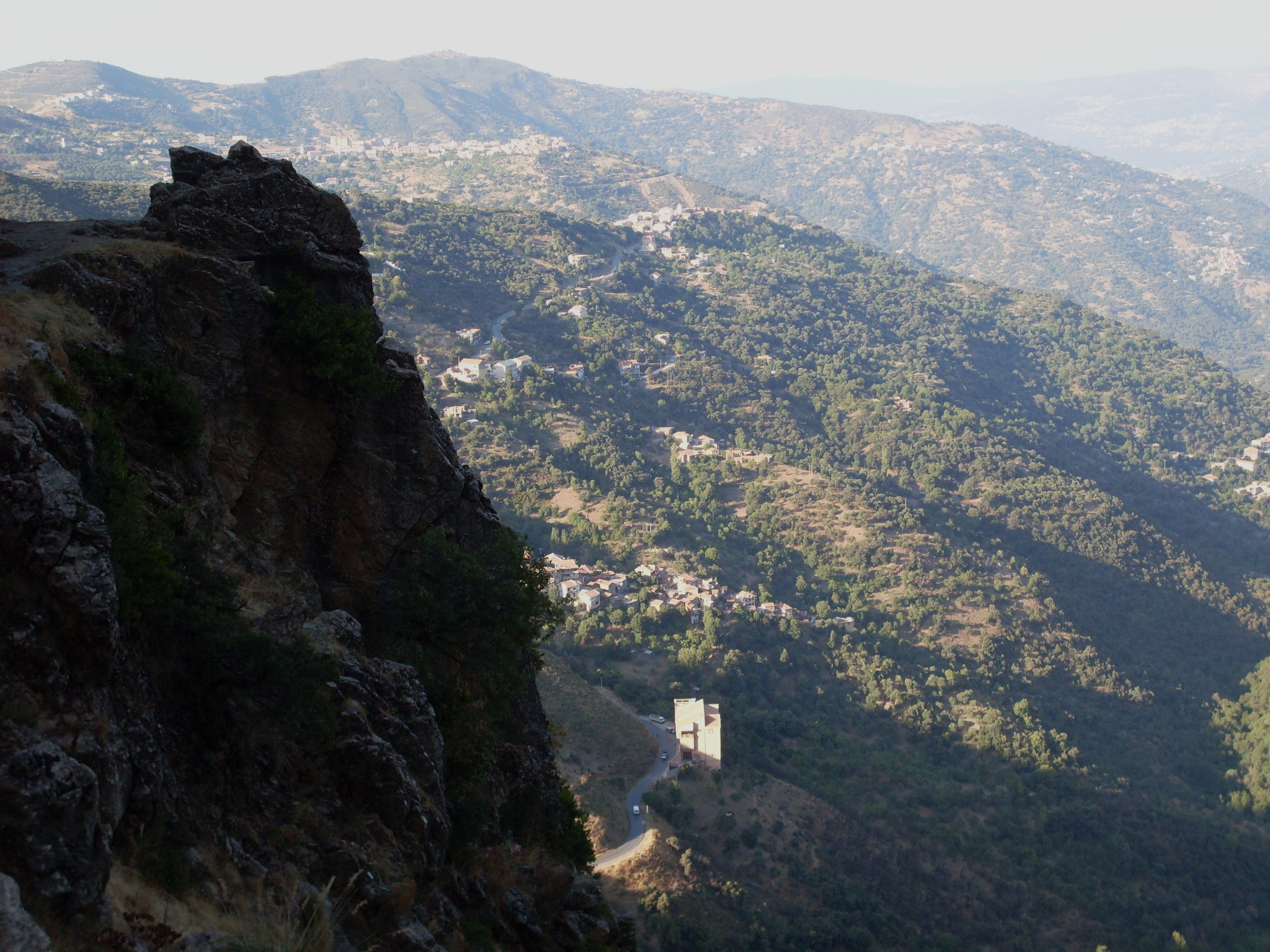
- View of Iferhounene and the surrounding villages

- Location of Daira Iferhounene in the Tizi Ouzou district

- Location within Algeria
- Country: Algeria
- Province: Tizi Ouzou Province

Government
  - APC President: Ouaissa Ghani

Area
  - Total: 12.72 sq mi (32.95 km^{2})
- Elevation: 3,600 ft (1,100 m)

Population (2008)
  - Total: 46,831
- Time zone: UTC+1 (CET)

Iferhounene (Arabic: ايفرحونن, Kabyle: Iferḥunen, TifinaƔ:ⵉⴼⴻⵔⵀⵓⵏⴻⵏ) is a town and commune in Tizi Ouzou Province in northern Algeria. It's the closest dense urban center east of Ain El Hammam and is traversed through daily by commuters. It's also known for its snowy climate during the winter.

== Geography ==
The town and most of the villages surrounding it are nestled south of the Djurdjura Mountains, boasting a rugged landscape with lush valleys, olive groves and steep cliffs. The Oued Sebaou originates from and flows through the district.

=== Road Network & External Connections ===
The district contains a single national road (RN-15) passing through it, and 2 local roads W-253 and W-7. Though, there are many smaller roads and dirt tracks forming a dense road network.

=== Climate ===
The region experiences a Mountainous-Mediterranean climate, characterized by hot, dry summers and cold, wet winters. The region enjoys abundant sunshine throughout the year, with average temperatures ranging from 5 °C (41 °F) in winter to 40 °C (103 °F) in summer.

Precipitation primarily occurs between November and March, with snow mainly falling and accumulating in the months of January, February and March.

Road closures are common in winter months due to snow accumulation, and the fact that the two main roads passing through the region are mountain passes.

Snowy mountains can be observed until mid-spring, and the Djurdjura Mountains provide chilly air and multiple cold fronts up until the second half of June.

There has been a sharp decline in precipitation and a rise in temperatures in the later 2010s and early 2020s due to climate change, as evident of it being in one of the most vulnerable countries to climate change.

== Culture ==
Iferhounene's downtown area maintains a long-held traditional market every Wednesday.

The district is known for its traditional dresses, like the "Robe Kabyle" and "Burnous", alongside the few local associations dedicated to preserving Kabyle culture. Many kabyle artists, comedians, and singers have originated from the district.

== Public transit ==
The entire district has 20 main lines.

The town of Iferhounene is served mainly by taxis and minibuses. Its transportation system includes 2 main minibus terminals:

=== Tizi Bouirene Terminal ===
The Tizi Bouirene (TB) terminal is divided into two zones: The "Ahdouche" part, and the "Monument" part. It's frequented by minibuses with diverse lines including but not limited to:

- TB - Ahdouche - Bechar
- TB - Ait el Mansour
- TB - Tikaatine
- TB - Ikhedachene
- TB - Imsouhal - Tizi Guefres - Boumessaoud

=== Iferhounene Terminal ===
The Iferhounene (IT) terminal is the main terminal in the town with minibuses and taxis combined, it's located in the same area as the local Wednesday market, near the historical village with the same name.

It's divided into three parts:

==== CW-253 ====
Named for the route its lines pass through, this part includes two lines:

- IT - Ait Arbi
- IT - Illilten

==== RN-15 ====
Also named for the route its lines traverse, this part includes two lines:

- IT - Lycée Iferhounene (Iferhounene High School)
- IT - Tirourda (village)

==== Michelet ====
The most frequently used and well-known stop in the town. Named for the common name of its main destination, this part consists of a single line:

- IT- Abi Youcef - Ain El Hammam
