= Iferhounène District =

Coordinates: 36.5338°N 4.3701°E

- District
- Interactive map of Iferhounène District
- Country: Algeria
- Province: Tizi Ouzou Province
- Time zone: UTC+1 (CET)

Iferhounène District is a district of Tizi Ouzou Province, Algeria.

The district is further divided into 3 municipalities:

- Iferhounène
- Illilten
- Imsouhal
