= Aïn El Hammam District =

Coordinates: 36.5713°N 4.3097°E

- District
- Interactive map of Aïn El Hammam District
- Country: Algeria
- Province: Tizi Ouzou Province
- Time zone: UTC+1 (CET)

Aïn El Hammam District is a district of Tizi Ouzou Province, Algeria.

The district is further divided into 4 municipalities:

- Abi Youcef
- Aïn El Hammam
- Aït Yahia
- Akbil
