= Lounès Matoub =

Algerian musician (1956–1998)

Lounès Matoub Maɛtub Lwennas
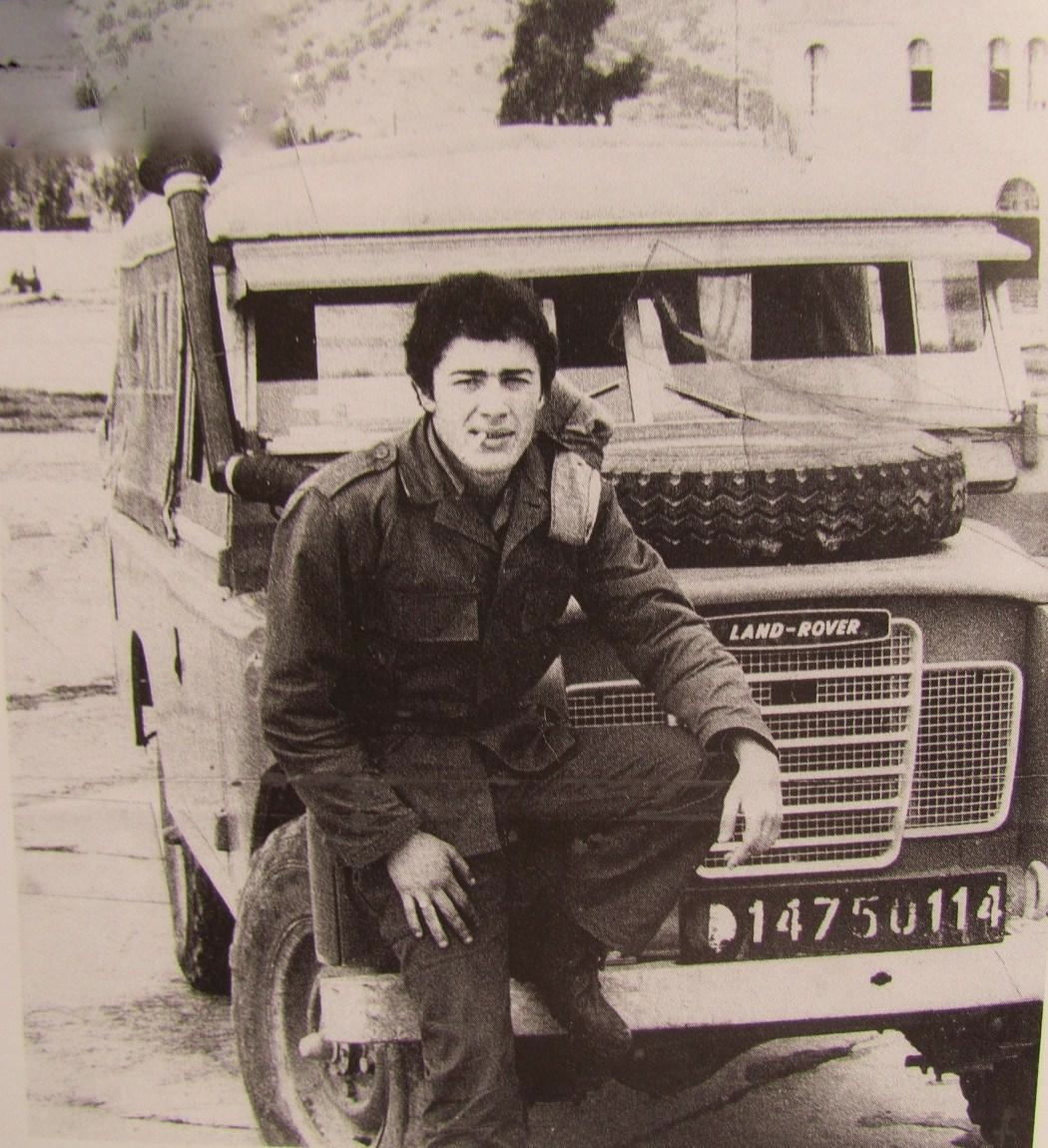
- Matoub during his military service from 1975 to 1977

Background information
- Born: Lounès Matoub; 24 January 1956; Taourirt Moussa, French Algeria
- Died: 25 June 1998 (aged 42) Tala Bounane, Algeria
- Genres: Kabyle music, chaabi
- Occupations: Singer, songwriter, musician, poet, political activist
- Instruments: Algerian mandole, guitar
- Years active: 1978–1998

Lounès Matoub (Kabyle: Maɛtub Lwennas; 24 January 1956 – 25 June 1998) was an Algerian Kabyle singer, poet, and thinker who sparked an intellectual revolution, and mandole player who was an advocate of the Amazigh cause, human rights, and secularism in Algeria throughout his life.

Matoub was shunned and criticized by many Algerian Arabs for his secular, atheist politics, his militant advocacy of Berber rights and blasphemous rock songs, making him unpopular among both warring parties during the Algerian Civil War. His assassination, claimed by the Armed Islamic Group (GIA), in unclear circumstances, provoked violent riots in Kabylia.

== Early life ==
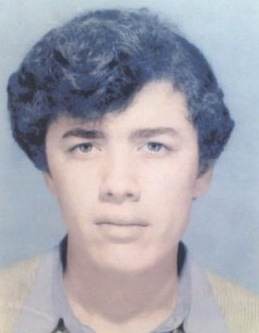
Matoub in 1973

Lounes Matoub was born on 24 January 1956 in the village of Taourirt Moussa belonging to the Aït Mahmoud in Kabylia. He was raised by his mother and grandmother in the absence of his father. When he turned 9, he built his first guitar from an empty car oil can and composed his first songs as a teenager. In his youth, Matoub was particularly fond of the White Fathers, who were French Catholic missionaries who were in charge of schools in Kabylia with a secular curriculum, because they spoke Kabyle and spoke to him about Berber history especially the Berber king Jugurtha. His political and cultural identity was awakened by armed confrontations between Kabylians and government forces in 1963–1964. In 1968, the Algerian government introduced a policy of Arabization in the education system. Matoub reacted by skipping school; his memoirs recall: "We had to give up Berber and reject French. I said no! I played hooky in all my Arabic classes. Every class that I missed was an act of resistance, a slice of liberty conquered. My rejection was voluntary and purposeful." By 1975, he had abandoned formal education. He left for France in search of work.

== Musical career ==
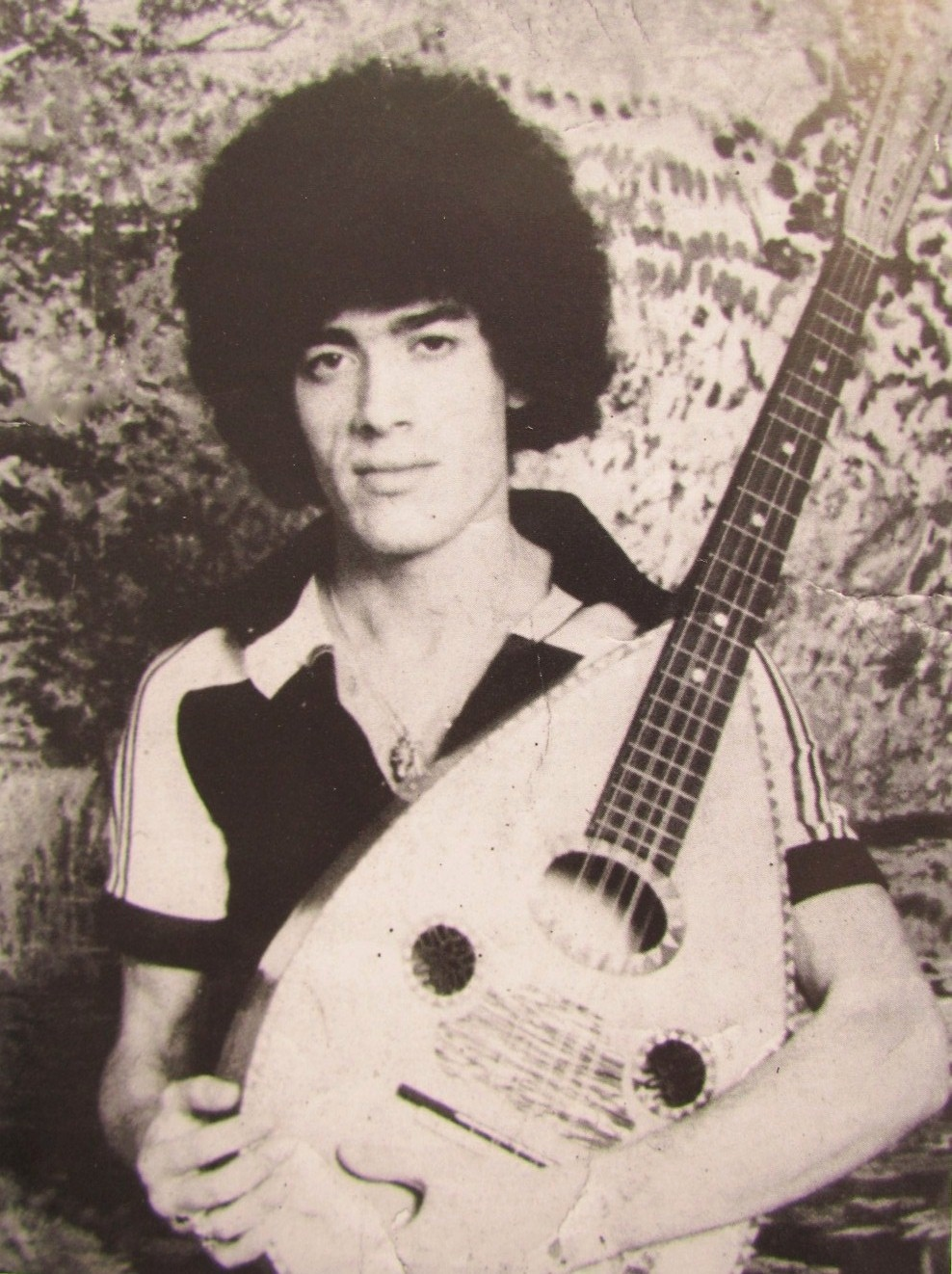
Matoub with his Algerian mandole in 1975. He was an Algerian singer of Kabyle music.

Matoub began his singing career under the patronage of the established singer Idir. He recorded his first album Ay Izem (The Lion) in 1978; it was a phenomenal success. He went on to record 36 albums, as well as writing songs for other artists. He gave his first major concert in April 1980, at the time of the "Berber Spring" protest movement in Kabylia.

His music mixes Algerian Andalucian Chaabi orchestration with politicized Kabyle (Berber) lyrics, and covers a broad variety of topics including the Berber cause, democracy, freedom, religion, Islamism, love, exile, memory, history, peace and human rights. Unlike the Berber poet/musicians who preceded him, Matoub's lyrics were direct and confrontational towards the Algerian government and those who stood against his principles. Fellow musician Mohamed Alileche recalls:

He went straight. He criticized a president. He mentioned the president of Algeria right in the beginning of his career. He goes black and white. He was very, very clear in his songs, and he is the only singer – not only Algeria, but in all of North Africa – who criticized the government and criticized clearly. He would never get afraid.

Despite being banned from Algerian radio and television during his life, Matoub became, and remains, an extremely popular Kabylian singer.

== Political events ==
During the riots in October 1988, Matoub was shot five times by a policeman and left for dead on the side of the road. He was hospitalised for two years, requiring 17 surgeries, including the insertion of an artificial scrotum and the contraction of his leg by 5 cm (2.0 in). His 1989 album L'Ironie du sort describes his long convalescence.

During the civil war, which began in 1992, the Islamist Armed Islamic Group added his name to a hitlist of artists and intellectuals. Despite this, Matoub remained in Algeria. On 25 September 1994, he was abducted. He was held for two weeks in a GIA mountain stronghold and condemned to death. He was released only after a large public demonstration in which his supporters from the MCB threatened "total war" on the Islamists and when he swore an oath to discontinue his musical career.

In 1994, he published his autobiography entitled Rebelle (Paris: Stock, 1995).

== Prizes ==
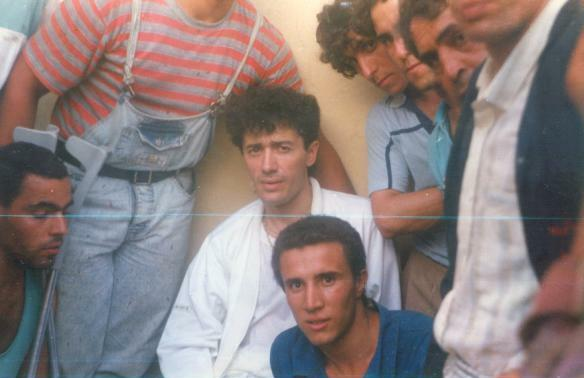
Lounès (in the middle with the white shirt) with his friends, notably Mourad Nechab, known to be his favorite, and family in Kabylia.

- On 6 December 1994, Matoub received Le Prix de la Mémoire ("The Memorial Prize") from Mrs. Danielle Mitterrand, President of La Fondation France Libertés ("The French Liberties Foundation") in Paris; the prize recognises those who devote themselves to recording and preserving the impact of political events on ordinary lives.
- On 22 March 1995, the Canadian journalists' organisation SCIJ awarded him Le Prix de la Liberté d'Expression ("The Prize for Freedom of Expression").
- On 19 December 1995, he received Le Prix Tahar Djaout ("The Tahar Djaout Prize") from La Fondation Nourredine Abba ("The Nourredine Abba Foundation") at UNESCO headquarters in Paris; the prize is named after an Algerian writer who was assassinated by Islamists in 1993.

== Assassination and aftermath ==
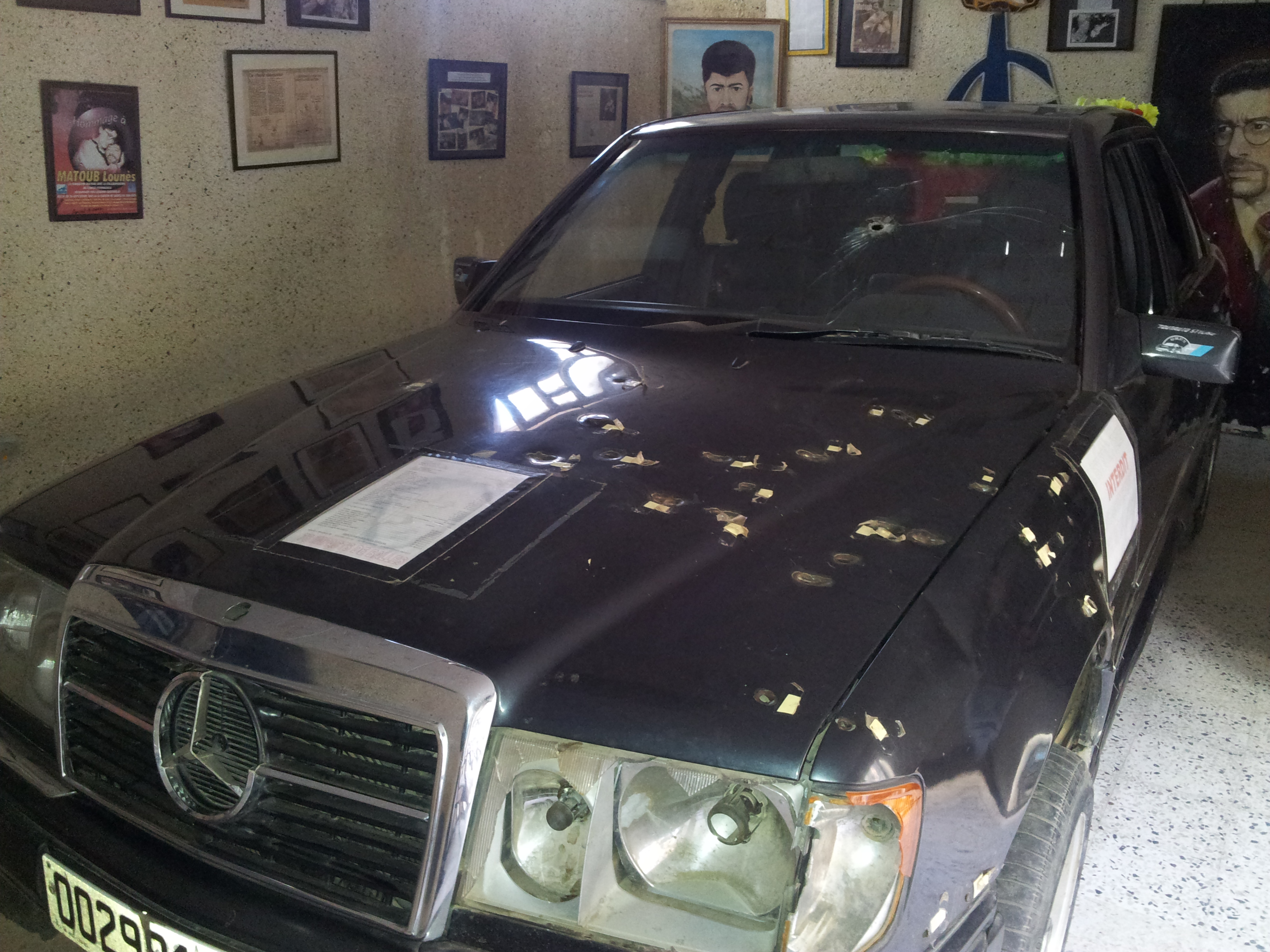
Matoub's car riddled with bullets during his assassination on 25 June 1998

On 25 June 1998, at approximately 12:30 pm local time, Matoub's car was stopped at a roadblock while he was driving along a mountainous road in eastern Algeria (Kabylia). The car was fired upon by masked gunmen, killing Matoub and wounding his wife, Nadia Matoub, and two sisters-in-law. Within hours, news of Matoub's murder had spread throughout Kabylia and thousands of angry mourners gathered around the hospital where his body was taken. The crowd shouted "Pouvoir, Assassin" ("Government, Assassins"). A week of violent riots followed his death. Young demonstrators clashed with riot police and attacked government property. On 28 June 1998 tens of thousands of people attended his funeral in front of his house in his native village. He was buried between a fig tree and a cherry tree, opposite the house he was born in. Matoub's family played a scathing parody of the Algerian national anthem, which came from Matoub's final album Lettre ouverte aux... ("Open letter to..."), released after his death (Gold-Disc). Matoub's assassination occurred a week before a law excluding languages other than Arabic from public life was due to come into effect. Matoub had been an outspoken critic of this law.

On 30 June 1998 the GIA claimed responsibility for the assassination of Matoub.

On the first anniversary of his death, a general strike was observed in the Kabylian city of Tizi-Ouzou and thousands protested on the streets. Protesters broke into the town's court room and tore down its scales of justice. The BBC reported that many Berber activists blamed the government for Matoub's death and rejected its claim that Islamists were responsible.

Around 20,000 people marched in Tizi-Ouzou to mark the third anniversary of Matoub's assassination.

His family have created a foundation in his name to promote his memory, cast light on the circumstances of his assassination and promote the values he defended. Two streets in France have been named after Matoub, one in Grenoble and one in Lyon.

On 18 July 2011, two men, Malik Madjnoun and Abdelhakim Chenoui, were convicted of killing Matoub, and sentenced to 12 years in jail. The one-day trial was suspended twice when Matoub's family interrupted to insist the suspects were innocent. As Madjnoun and Chenoui had been in prison awaiting trial since 1999, they were released in 2012, having served their time.

== Political views of Matoub ==
Matoub spoke out in favour of federalism, secularism, democracy, freedom of speech, the recognition of Berber as a national and official language, and the decentralization of public schools in Algeria.

For a period of time, he was a member of the Rally for Culture and Democracy, an opposition party in Algeria, although he had left the party by the time of his death.
