= Lounis Ait Menguellet =

Algerian singer (born 1950)

Lounis Aït Menguellet
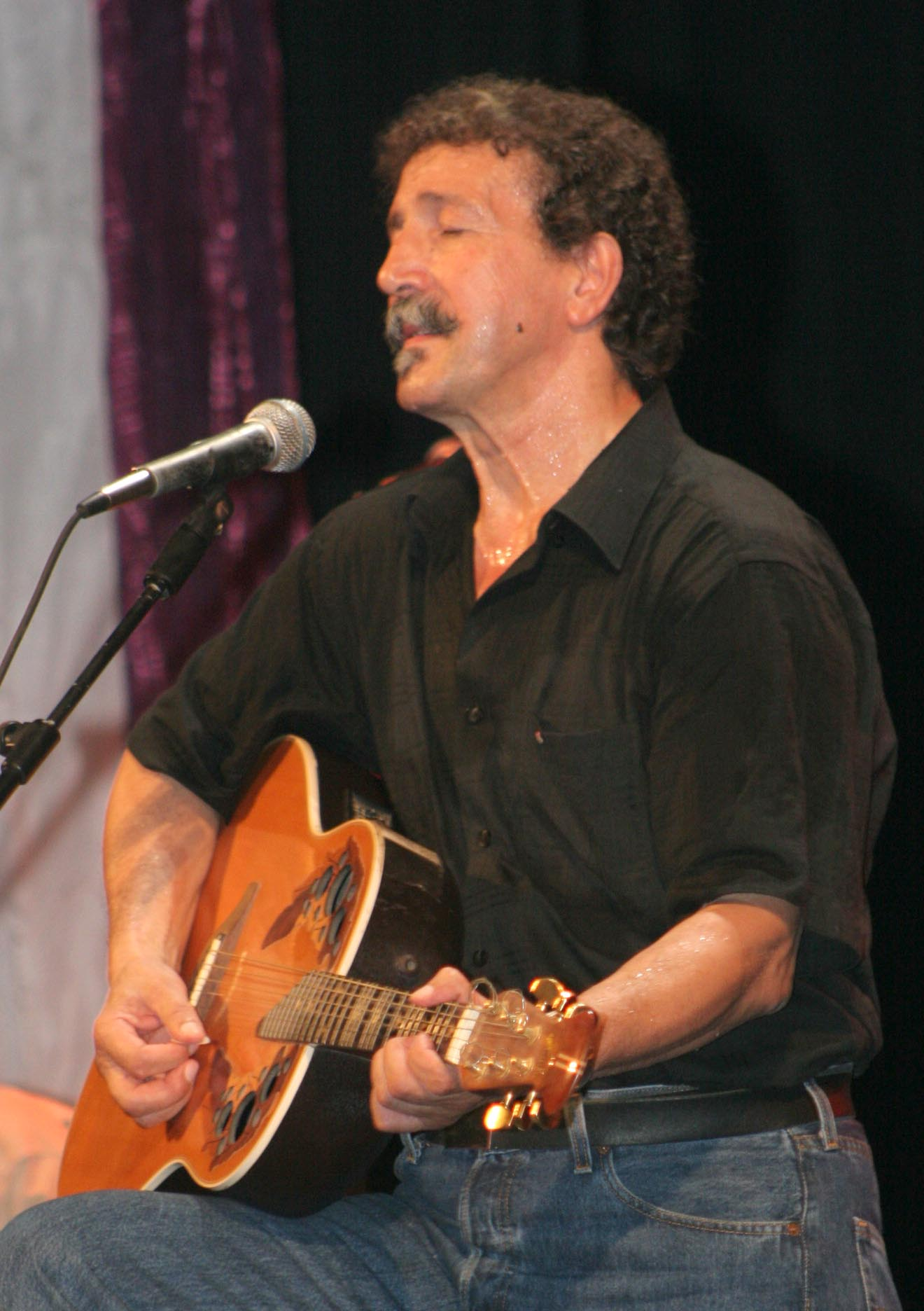
- Lounis at a concert in Algiers

Background information
- Also known as: Lounis Aït Menguellet
- Born: Abdenbi Aït Menguellet; 17 January 1950; Ighil Bouammas, Tizi Ouzou, French Algeria
- Genres: World music
- Occupations: Singer, poet
- Instrument: Guitar
- Years active: 1967–present

Abdenbi Aït Menguellet known as Lounis Aït Menguellet (Kabyle: Ɛbdennbi At Mengellat or Lewnis At Mengellat, born 17 January 1950) is an Algerian singer born in Ighil Bouammas, Tizi Ouzou Province in the Kabylie region. Lounis Aït Menguellet sings in the Berber languages (Kabyle variant).

== Discography ==
Year	Kabyle Title	French Title	English Translation
1975	Telt yam	Trois jours	Three Days
1976	Anida teğğam mmi	Où avez-vous laissé mon fils	Where you left my son
1977	Amjahed	Le martyre	the martyr
1978	Aεeṭṭar		
1979	Ay agu	Oh nuage	O fogue
1981	A lmus-iw	Mon sabre	My sword
1982	Eṭes eṭes	Dors, dors	Sleep, sleep
1983	A mmi	Oh Mon fils	O my son
1984	Eğğet-iyi	Laissez-moi	Leave me
1986	Asefru	Le poème	The Poem
1988		Les années d'or (6 volumes	The Golden Years (6 albums)
1989	Acimi	Pourquoi ?	Why?
1990	Avriḍ n ṭemzi (tirga n ṭemzi)	Chemin de jeunesse (rêves de jeunesse)	The way of youth (dreams of youth)
1992	A kwen-ixḍeε Rebbi	Que Dieu vous maudisse	Be Cursed
1993	Awal	Le Mot	The Word
1995	Iminig g-iḍ	Le Voyageur de Nuit	Traveller of the Night
1997	Siwel-iyi-d tamacahut	Raconte-moi une histoire	Tell me a story
1999	Inagan (Tiregwa)	Témoins (Ruisseaux)	Witness (Streams)
2001	Inasen	Dis leur	Tell them
2005	Yenna-d wemγar	Le sage a dit	The wise-man said
2010	Tawriqt Tacevhant	La Feuille Belle	The Beautiful Sheet
2014	Isefra	Les poemes	Poems
2017	Tudert nni	Cette vie	That life
2024	Snitra-w	Ma guitare	My Guitar
