= Émile Masqueray =

French anthropologist, linguist, and writer

- Born: 20 March 1843; Rouen
- Died: 19 August 1894 (aged 51); Saint-Étienne-du-Rouvray
- Occupations: Anthropologist; Linguist

Émile Masqueray (20 March 1843 – 19 August 1894) was a 19th-century French anthropologist, linguist, and writer. He was an expert on the Berber–Tuareg peoples of North Africa.

He graduated from the Lycée Pierre-Corneille and the École Normale, where he became a professor of history in 1869. In pursuit of an archaeological assignment, he began teaching at a high school in Algiers in 1872.

In 1873 he began learning Arabic and several Berber languages and was interested in their philology and the social structures of Berber society. Another interest was in archaeology, especially the Roman ruins of Aures. He spent nearly two months in Mzab where he translated Beni Mzab the Kitab of the Nile and the Chronicle of Abu Zakaria Yahyá ibn Abi Bakr al-Warjalani, which were religious and legislative histories that described the origins of the Ibadi sect. (Algiers, A. Jordan, 1890) The following year, he published "Comparaison du dialecte des Zenaga du Sénégal avec le vocabulaire des Chaïa et des Beni-M'zab" (a comparison of the Zenaga dialect of Senegal, which included a vocabulary of Chaia and Beni M'zab).

Masqueray then taught history and African antiquity at the School of Arts in Algiers before being appointed the Paul Bert Director in 1878. This influenced his friend Jules Ferry to embrace Berber culture and resulted in four schools being opened in Kabylie in 1881.

His work "Formation des Cités chez les populations sédentaires de l'Algérie" had a lasting influence in academia. He refuted the colonial idea sedentary and nomadic lifestyles were associated with race and instead argued that these ways of life were determined by their environment.

Émile Masqueray also created the "Bulletin de correspondance africaine".

The cities of Rouen and Saint-Étienne-du-Rouvray have named streets after him.

== Works ==
- Dictionnaire français-touareg, dialecte des taïtoq, suivi d’observations grammaticales, Paris, E. Leroux, 1893.
- Formation des cités chez les populations sédentaires de l’Algérie (Kabyles du Djurdjura, Chaiuïa de l’Aourâs, Beni Mezâb), Paris, E. Leroux, 1886.
- Formation des cités chez les populations sédentaires de l’Algérie : Kabyles du Djurdjura, Chaouïa de l’Aourâs, Beni Mezâb, Éd. Fanny Colonna, Aix-en-Provence, Edisud, 1886 ; 1983 (ISBN 978-2-85744-140-3).
- Note concernant les Aoulad-Daoud du Mont-Aurès (Aourâs), Alger, A. Jourdan, 1879.
- Observations grammaticales sur la grammaire touareg et textes de la tamahaq des Taïtoq, Éd. René Basset, Maurice Gaudefroy-Demombynes, Paris, E. Leroux, 1896-1897.
- Ruines anciennes de Khenchela (Mascula) a Besseriani (Ad Majores), Alger, A. Jourdan, 1879.
- Souvenirs et visions d’Afrique, Éd. Michèle Salinas, Paris, La Boîte à Documents, 1894 ; 1997 (ISBN 978-2-84316-004-2).

== Sources ==
- Augustin Bernard, Napoléon Lacroix, Algérie. Historique de la pénétration saharienne, Alger, Giralt, 1900.
- Numa Broc, Dictionnaire des Explorateurs français du XIXe siècle, T.1, Afrique, CTHS, 1988, (p. 225)
