= Béni-Aïssi =

Béni-Aïssi At-Aïssi
- Commune and town
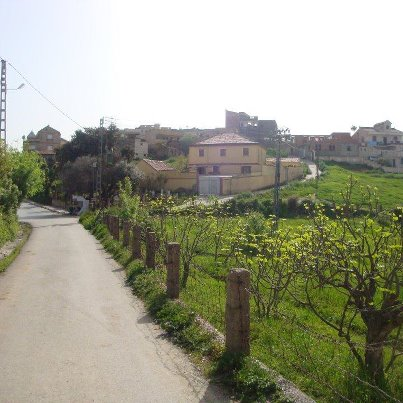

- Location within Algeria
- Country: Algeria
- Province: Tizi Ouzou Province
- Time zone: UTC+1 (CET)

Béni-Aïssi/At-Aïssi is a town and commune in Tizi Ouzou Province in northern Algeria. It is also where Lounès Matoub, a famous Kabyle musician, was assassinated on 25 June 1998.
