= Béni-Zmenzer =

- Commune and town
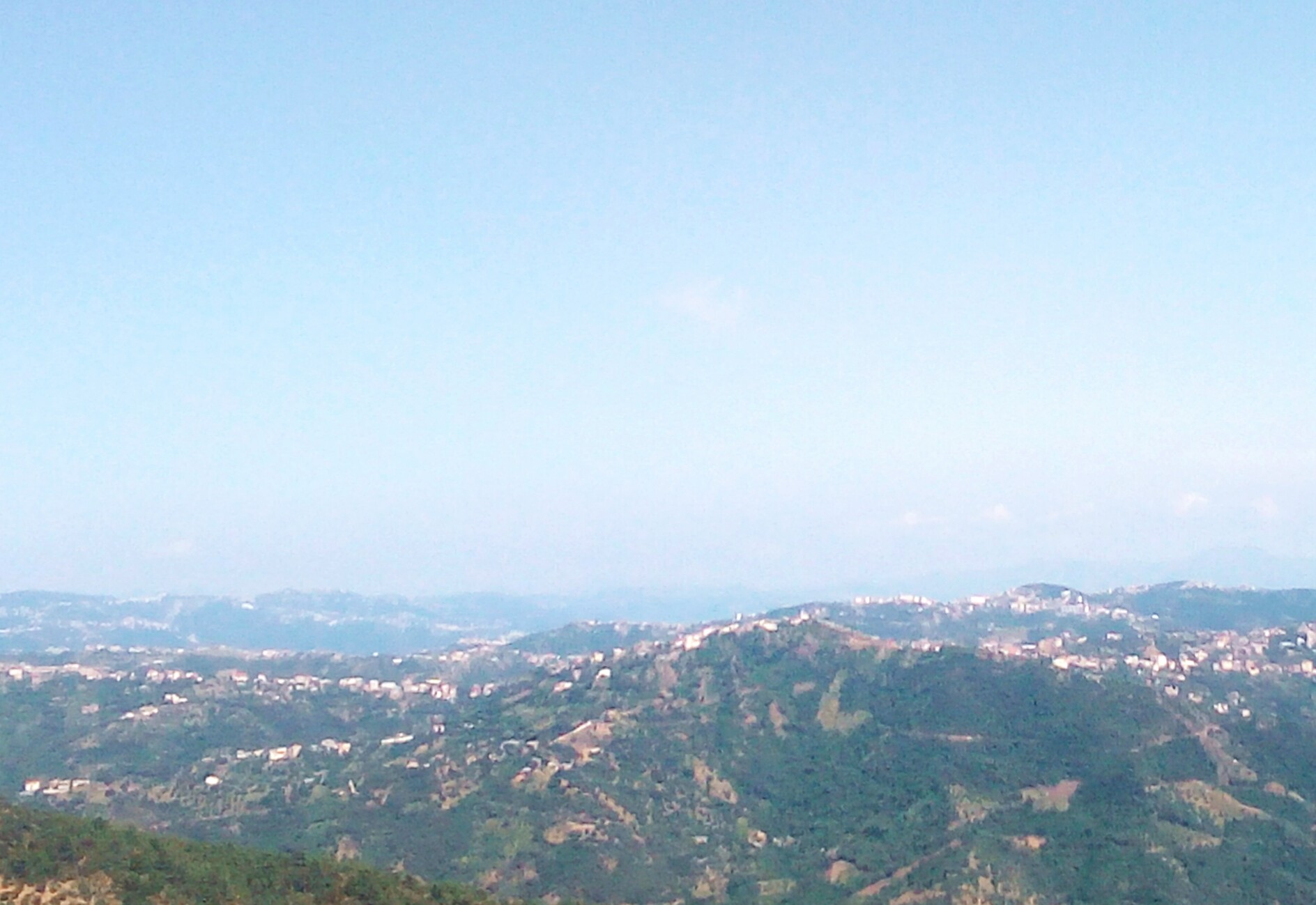

- Location within Algeria
- Country: Algeria
- Province: Tizi Ouzou Province
- Time zone: UTC+1 (CET)

Béni-Zmenzer is a town and commune in Tizi Ouzou Province in northern Algeria.
