= M'Chedallah =

Coordinates: 36°22′N 4°16′E

- Commune and town
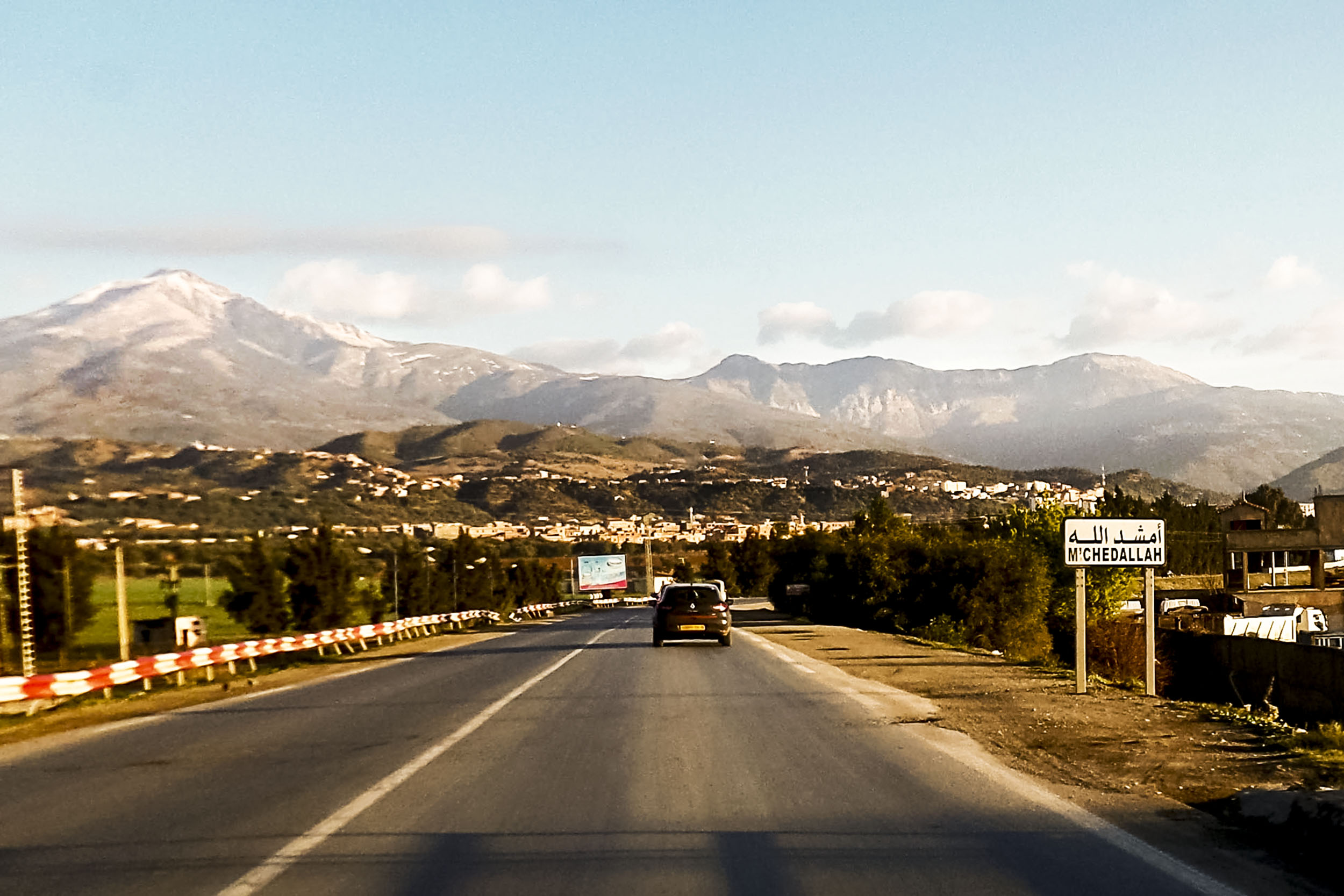
- Interactive map of M'Chedallah
- Country: Algeria
- Province: Bouïra Province

Population (1998)
  - Total: 21,593
- Time zone: UTC+1 (CET)

M'Chedallah is a town and commune in Bouïra Province, Algeria. According to the 1998 census it has a population of 21,593.
