= Fanny Colonna =

Algerian sociologist

- Born: 1934; El Milia
- Died: 18 November 2014 (aged 79–80)

Academic work
- Discipline: sociologist, anthropologist
- Institutions: Mouloud Mammeri University of Tizi-Ouzou

Fanny Colonna (1934 - 18 November 2014) was a French-Algerian sociologist and anthropologist. She was also a professor at Tizi Ouzou University.

== Biography ==
Colonna was born in El Milia, and was the daughter of a French civil servant "who made sure she learned Arabic." Colonna lived in Algeria until 1993. She "established her reputation with a study of the Algerian schoolteacher class during the colonial period." Colonna also conducted an ethnographic study in the Aures between 1970 and 1980.

== Selected works ==
- Instituteurs algériens. Paris: Presses de la Fondation nationale des sciences politiques. 1975. ISBN 9782724603330.
- Timimoun, une civilisation citadine. Alger: Entreprise algérienne de presse. 1989. OCLC 21520363.
- Aurès, Algérie 1954 : les fruits verts d'une révolution. Paris: Ed. Autrement. 1994. ISBN 9782862605012.
- Les versets de l'invincibilité : permanence et changements religieux dans l'Algérie contemporaine. Paris: Presses de la Fondation nationale des sciences politiques. 1995. ISBN 9782724606751.
- Récits de la province égyptienne : une ethnographie sud-sud. Paris: Sindbad. 2003. ISBN 9782742743605.
