= Thomas Shaw (divine and traveller) =

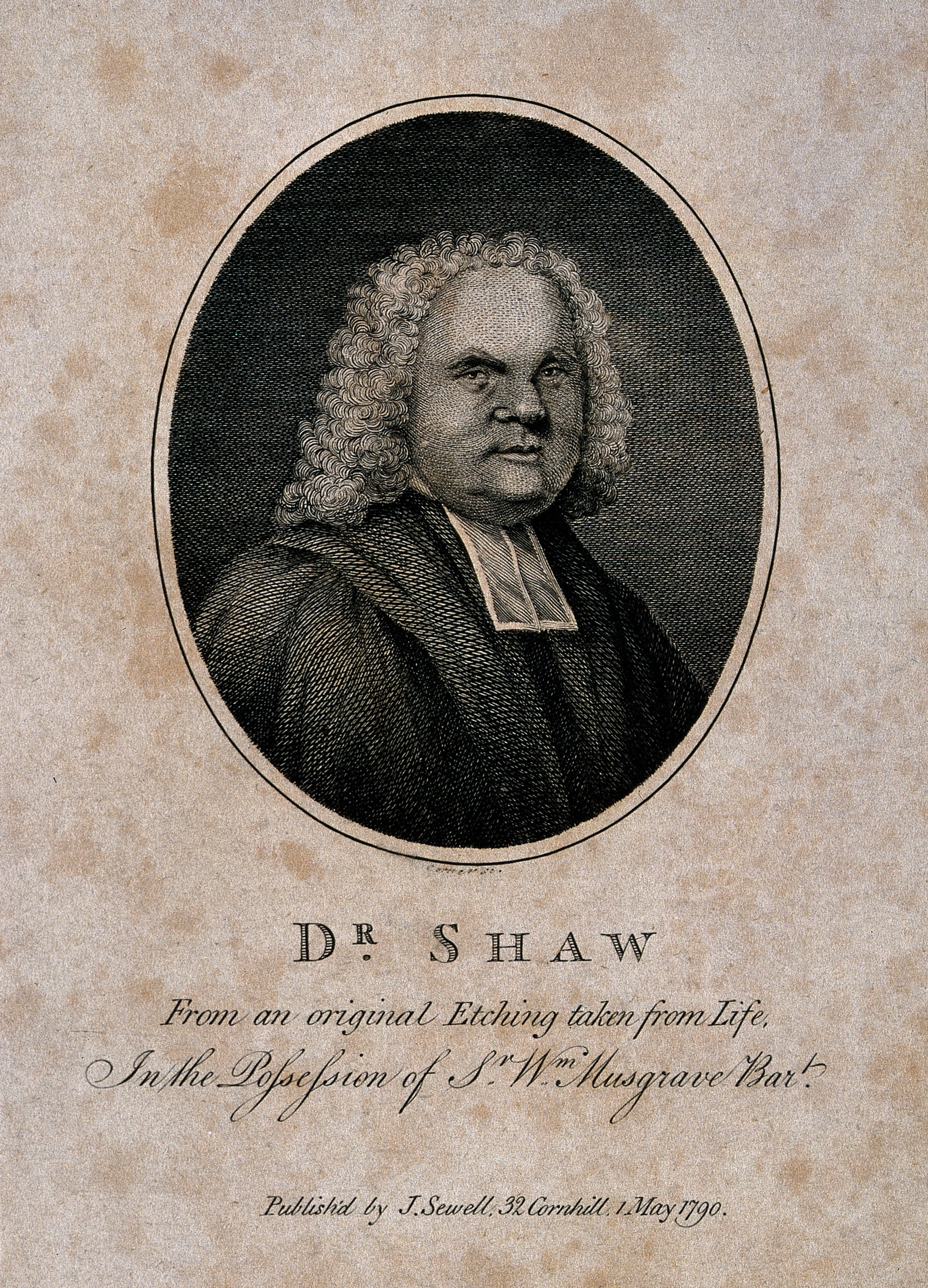
Thomas Shaw. Line engraving by Cormer (?), 1790. Wellcome V0005412.jpg

Thomas Shaw (1694–1751) was an English cleric and traveller.

== Life ==
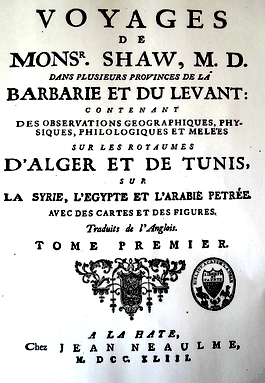
1743 edition of Thomas Shaw works.

He was born about in Kendal, Westmorland. From the grammar school of his native town, he went to The Queen's College, Oxford, where he took his master's degree in 1719.

On entering holy orders, he was appointed chaplain to the factory at Algiers. While in north Africa he traveled through Algiers, Tunisia, Syria, Egypt, and Arabia in the first half of the eighteenth century. He is best known for his account of his travels, first published in Oxford in 1738 and published in a French translation in The Hague by Jean Neaulme in 1743; another translation of J. MacCarthy is published by Marlin in Paris in 1830. The preface of this edition indicates that he would have lived twelve years in Algiers (1720-1732). He became a Fellow of his college in 1727, in his absence.

During his travels he made crude daily geodetic surveys from which he draws maps attached to his work. he also made use of the Roman Itinerary of Antoninus and the 12th century Arab geographer Al Idrissi in his works.

On his return, in 1733, Shaw took his doctor's degree, and was elected a Fellow of the Royal Society. In 1740, on the death of Henry Felton, he was nominated principal of St Edmund Hall, with which he held the Greek professorship, and the vicarage of Bramley in Hampshire, till his death in 1751.

In the 19th century, his century-old work again gained favor during the French conquest of Algiers in 1830. In fact, apart from the spy mission in the vicinity of Algiers led by the engineer Vincent-Yves Boutin in 1808, it seems that the French had very little information on Algeria more recent than that of Shaw.

Also, the geographical and "sociological" part of his 1830 edition named Historical, statistical and topographical facts on the State of Algiers, and was used of the expeditionary army of Africa.

== Works ==
The first edition of Shaw's Travels in Barbary and the Levant was printed at Oxford, in 1738. Richard Pococke commented unfavourably on parts of the work in his Description of the East (1745), and Shaw published two supplements in vindication, which were incorporated in the edition of 1757.

Today Shaw is better known in France than his native England.
