= Aït Mahmoud =

Aït Mahmoud أيت محمود
- Commune and town
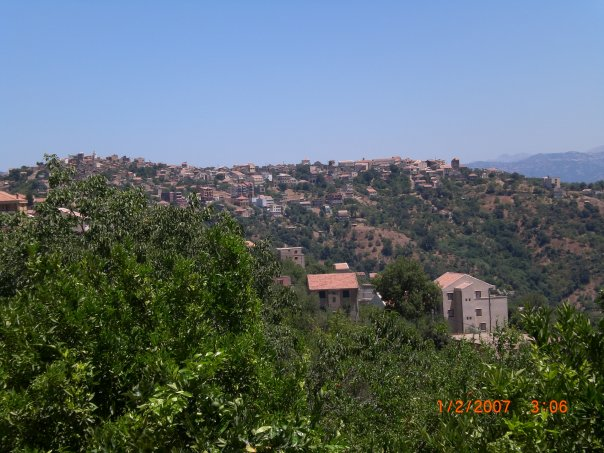

- Location within Algeria
- Coordinates: 36.508394°N 3.993187°E
- Country: Algeria
- Province: Tizi Ouzou Province
- Time zone: UTC+1 (CET)

Aït Mahmoud is a town and commune in Tizi Ouzou Province in northern Algeria.
