= Abi Youcef =

- Commune and town
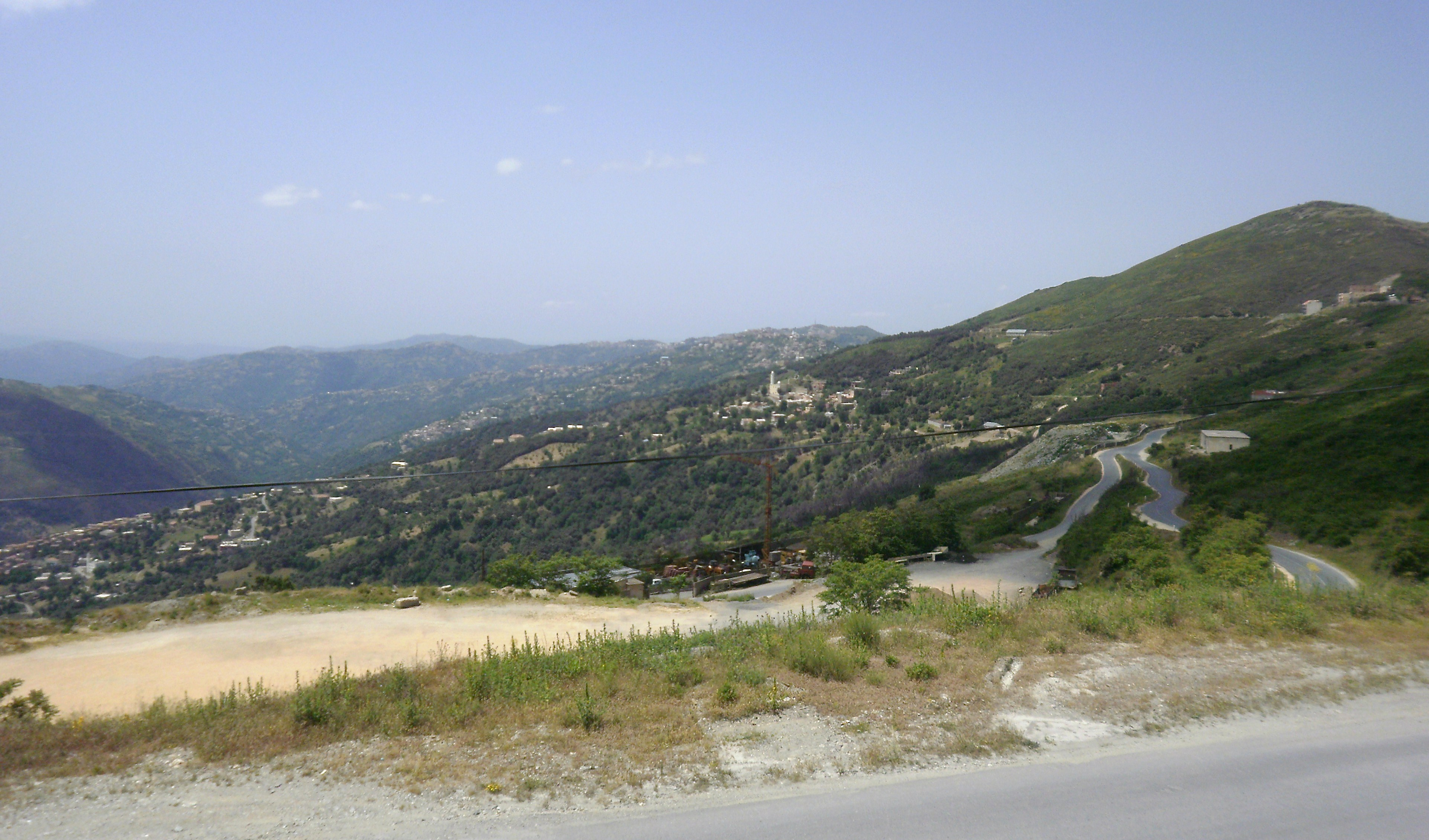

- Location of Abi Youcef within Tizi Ouzou Province

- Location of Abi Youcef within Algeria
- Coordinates: 36°33′4″N 4°20′0″E
- Country: Algeria
- Province: Tizi Ouzou Province
- District: Aïn El Hammam District

Area
  - Total: 6.51 sq mi (16.86 km^{2})

Population (2008)
  - Total: 7,693
- Time zone: UTC+1 (CET)
- Climate: Csa

Abi Youcef is a town and commune in northern Algeria in the Tizi Ouzou Province in the Kabylia region.
