= Illilten =

- Commune and town
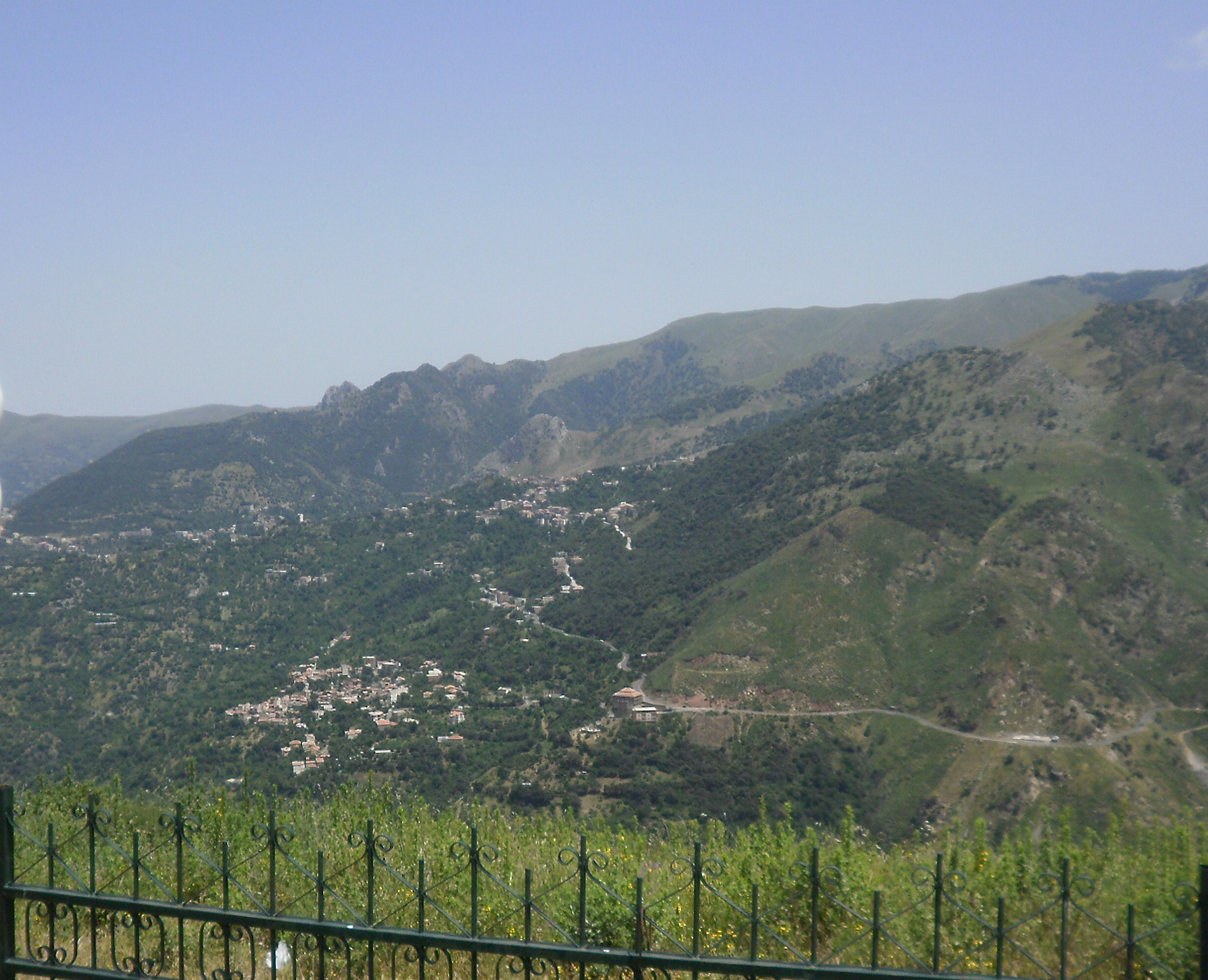

- Location within Algeria
- Country: Algeria
- Province: Tizi Ouzou Province

Population (2008)
  - Total: 24,965
  - Density: 2,400/sq mi (930/km^{2})
- Time zone: UTC+1 (CET)
- NOS: 15036

Illilten is a town and commune in Tizi Ouzou Province in northern Algeria. It is located in the mountains near the Tyrrhenian Sea.
