= Aïn El Hammam =

Aïn El Hammam Soq ne Ts'latha Trisipa
- Commune and town
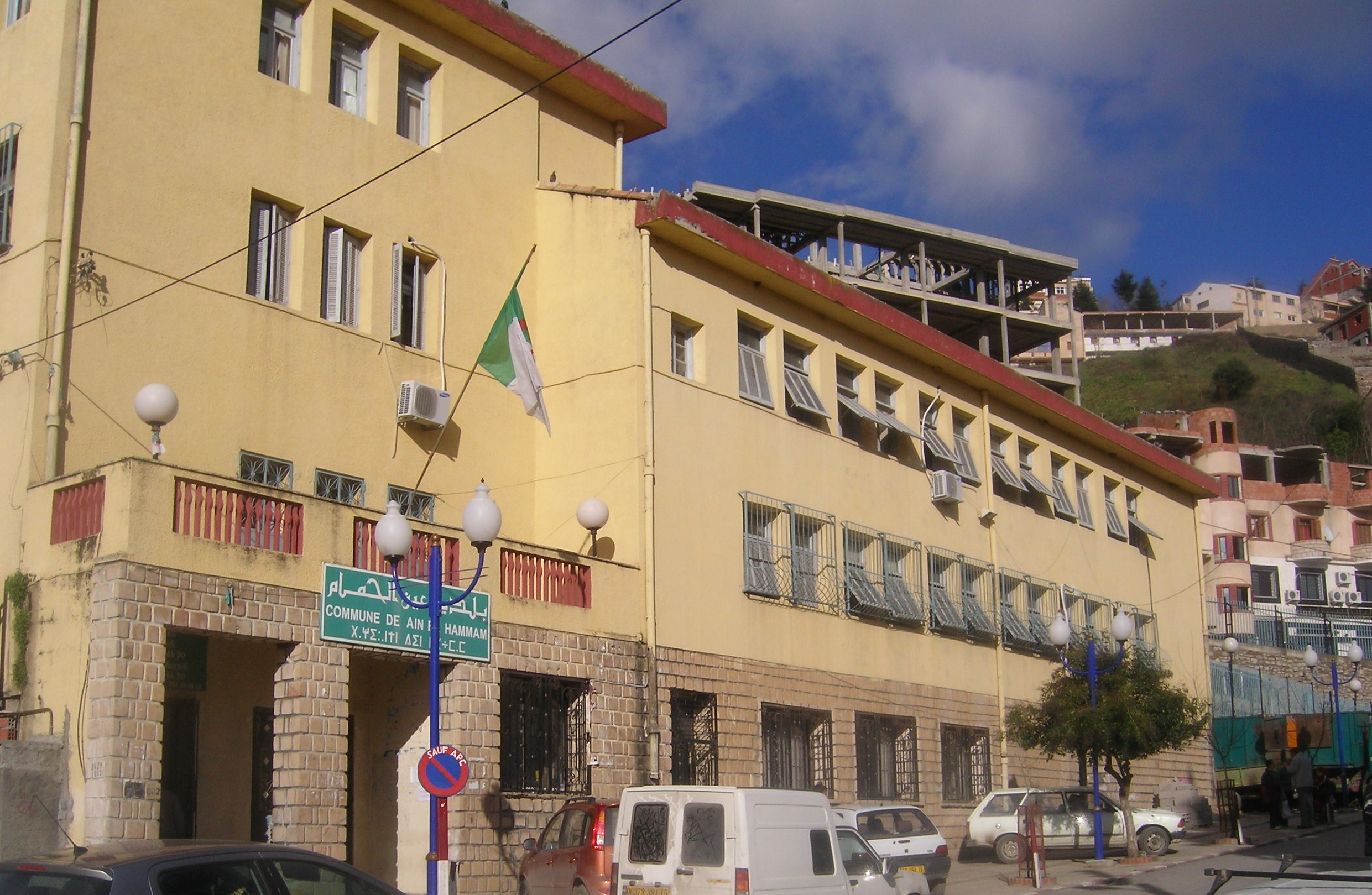
- Townhall
- Nickname: Michelet
- Location of Ain El Hammam within Tizi Ouzou Province

- Location of Ain El Hammam within Algeria
- Coordinates: 36°34′17″N 4°18′35″E
- Country: Algeria
- Province: Tizi Ouzou Province
- Time zone: UTC+1 (CET)

Aïn El Hammam is a town and commune in Tizi Ouzou Province in northern Algeria.

== Description ==
Ain El Hammam was called Michelet during the colonial period, so called in homage to the French historian Jules Michelet. It is today an Algerian commune of the Tizi Ouzou Province, in Kabylia, located 45 km southeast of Tizi Ouzou and 95 km northeast of Bouïra. Some call it the hammam locally because being a cold thermal spring well recognized in time, it was also Soq ne Ts'latha; or "market of Tuesday", surrounded by markets known in the region like Sevt nath yahya, Souq el Djemaa, Larvaa nath Iratehen, etc. The city is located on the north slope of Djurdjura, at 1080 meters above sea level. The villages of the commune of Aïn El Hammam are built on the side of mountain, up to an altitude of 1800 meters

The commune is famous for carpet weaving in bright colors.

"Ain El Hammam" is a composite toponym, derived from the basis of the word "ain", from classical Arabic ayn and from Algerian Arabic ain, meaning "source" and corresponds for the Arabic component "el hammam" to the word "Thermal baths". The full name of the commune therefore means "source of the thermal baths".

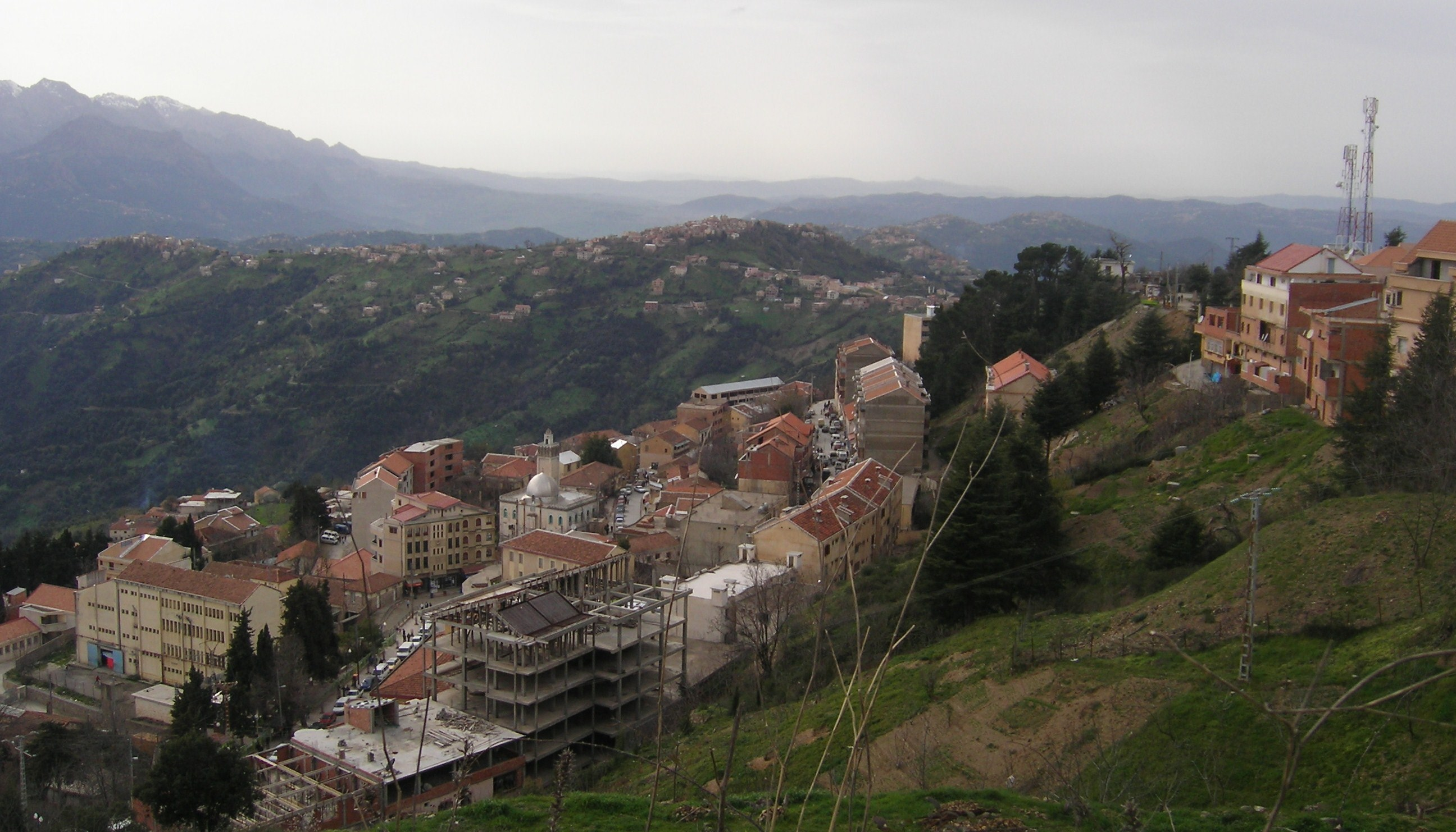
View of a part of Ain el Hammam and some villages of At Menguellat

The commune was created by the French under the name of "Michelet" in tribute to the French historian Jules Michelet. After the independence of Algeria, the commune was called Aïn El Hammam within the framework of the arabization of the names of place. However, the town (now the capital of the commune) continues to be locally named Michelet, or Michli, Michyi, which are eroded or Kabylian forms of Michelet.

Asqif n-Ṭmana is only the name of a part of this urban center with sprawling ramifications. Indeed Asqif n Tmana is the old northern entrance of the town corresponding to the ancient hamlet of Ait-Sidi-Said comprising the cemetery where is buried the bard Kabyle Si Muhand U M'hand .

Other information, refer to another former name of the region before the French colonization, which was Tala BUDHI (literary translation: the fountain of butter).

== History ==
During the Roman Empire the town was called Trisipa and was a civitas. Trisipa was the seat of an ancient bishopric, which survives today as a titular bishopric of the Roman Catholic Church. Two bishops of the town are known. Victor, attendee at the Council of Carthage (411) and Felix, who signed a group letter to Paul, the Patriarch of Constantinople regarding Monothelites.

=== The Ottoman period ===
Aourir did Mengelet should not be confused with the village not far from Aourir in the town of Ifigha, of the tribe of the Ait Ghobri, which was that of Sidi Ahmed el Kadhi or the founder of the kingdom Koukou.

=== The colonial period ===
The locality of Michelet, founded in 1881, was located where stood the weekly market Aït Menguellat, formerly known Thalatha Aït Menguellat ("At the Tuesday Menguellat"), between the hamlet of Asqif-n-Ṭmana and the village of At-Sidi-Sɛid. Subsequently, Michelet also hosted the Ait Yahya market that was previously in Sabt (therefore on Saturdays) to three kilometers away, on the outskirts of Ait Hichem, just at the current capital of the commune of Aït Yahia.

Michelet is an administrative center established as the capital of the mixed commune of Djurdjura 5, placed (like all mixed municipalities) under the direction of a deputy head of the prefectural administration and its deputies; The mixed commune is divided into a number of douars, each under the direction of an "indigenous deputy" (caid from 1919).
