= Capture of Algiers (1516) =

16th century battle resulting in the Ottoman capture of Algiers

- Part of Spanish–Ottoman wars
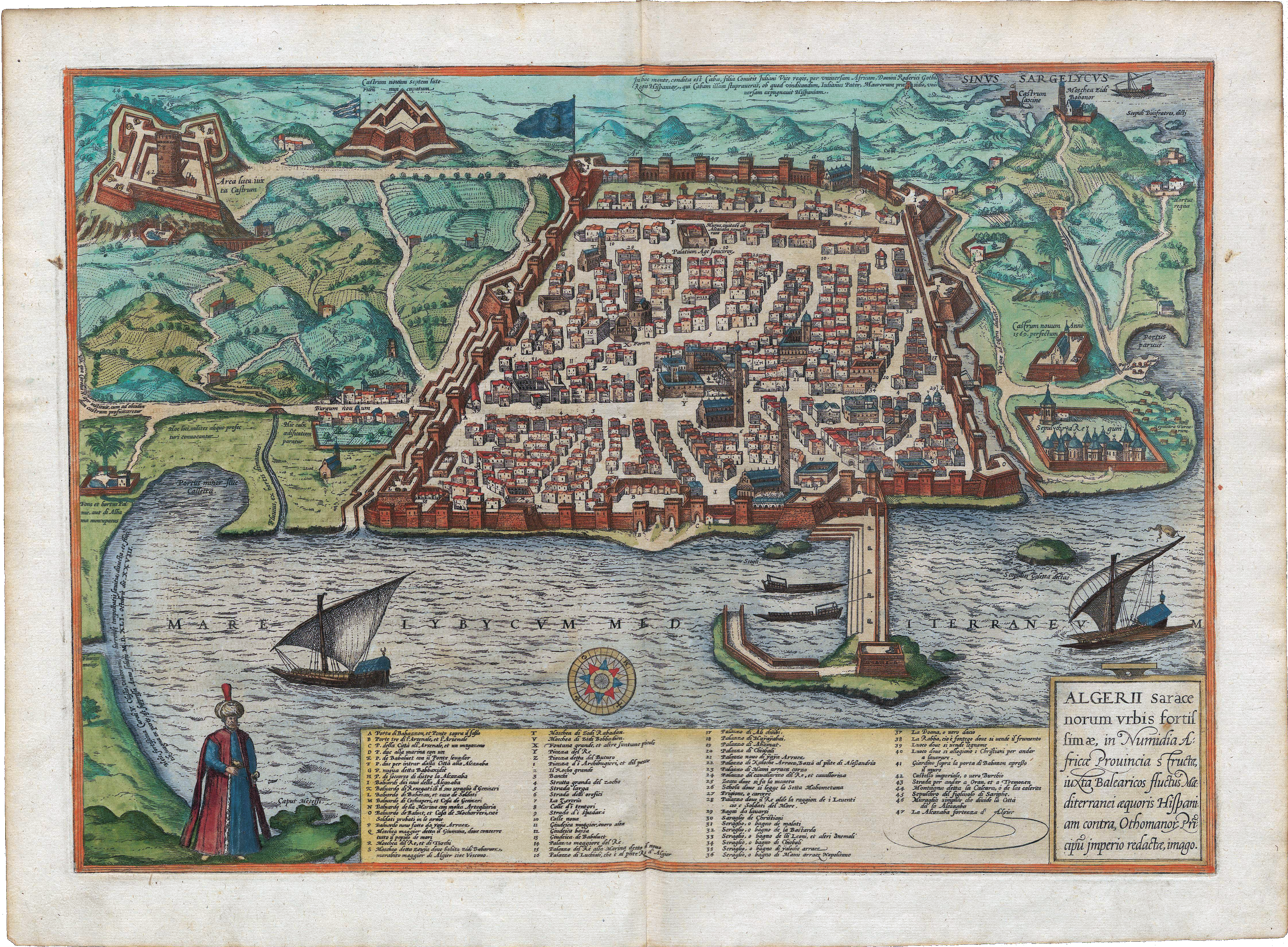
- City of Algiers in the 16th century, by Georg Braun
Date	September/October 1516
Location	Algiers
Result	Algerian victory

Belligerents
Regency of Algiers; Kingdom of Kuku	Spanish Empire; Sheikh of Ténès

Commanders and leaders
Oruç Reis; Sidi Ahmed; Hayreddin Barbarossa	Diego de Vera; Moulay-bou-Abdallah of Ténès

Units involved
5,000 Kabyles or 1,500 men	10,000 or 15,000 men under Diego de Vera; 10,000 Moors under the Sheikh of Ténès; Total: 20,000–25,000 men

Casualties and losses
Very few	3,000 killed or wounded 400 captured 8,000 men lost in total

The capture of Algiers in 1516 was accomplished by the brothers Oruç and Hayreddin Barbarossa against Sālim al-Tūmī, the ruler of the city of Algiers, which was followed by an unsuccessful military campaign by the Spanish Empire and the Sheikh of Ténès to overthrow the newly formed Sultanate of Algiers.

== Background ==
In 1510, the Spaniards had established themselves on a small island in front of Algiers, and forced the local ruler Sālim al-Tūmī (Selim-bin-Teumi) to accept their presence through a treaty and pay tribute. Fortifications were built on the islet, and a garrison of 200 men was established. Sālim al-Tūmī had to go to Spain to take an oath of obedience to Ferdinand of Aragon.

In 1516, Sālim Al-Tūmī, invited the corsair brothers Oruç and Hayreddin to expel the Spaniards. Oruç, with the help of local troops, came to Algiers with his ally Ahmad al-Kadi of the Kingdom of Kuku and an army composed of 800 Turks and 5,000 Kabyle auxiliaries. The Moors gave a huge triumph to Oruç, but after failing to take the Peñón of Algiers from the Spanish, he ordered Sālim strangled because Salim was conspiring with the Spaniards against him.

Sālim Al-Tūmī had a son who managed to escape and take refuge in Spain, where Charles V reigned. He welcomed the son of Al-Tūmī with favour, since he and the Sheikh of Ténès wanted to drive out Oruç Barbarossa.

== Spanish expedition to Algiers ==
The Spanish expedition included 10,000 or 15,000 soldiers and 10,000 Moors from Ténès.

Barbarossa's force included only 1,500 men. It was composed of:

- The Turkish companions of Oruç in the vanguard, and they were very few, leading the teams
- Immigrants from Andalusia, called “Fauquefels” by the King of Spain Philip II, according to what the latter narrated: "There are 15,000 people in the city of Algiers who are good at using firearms, including ten thousand Arab men who were displaced from Spain. In recent years, they are among the best soldiers"
- The inhabitants of the city, whom the Spaniards believed would help them.

=== Battle plans ===
Oruç's plan was the following:

1. Allow the enemy to land, without much resistance
2. Leave most of the Muslim forces within the forts and walls of the city, to use them when needed
3. Engage with the enemy in ambush warfare around the city, until he became exhausted, and then bring most of the striking power to the field.

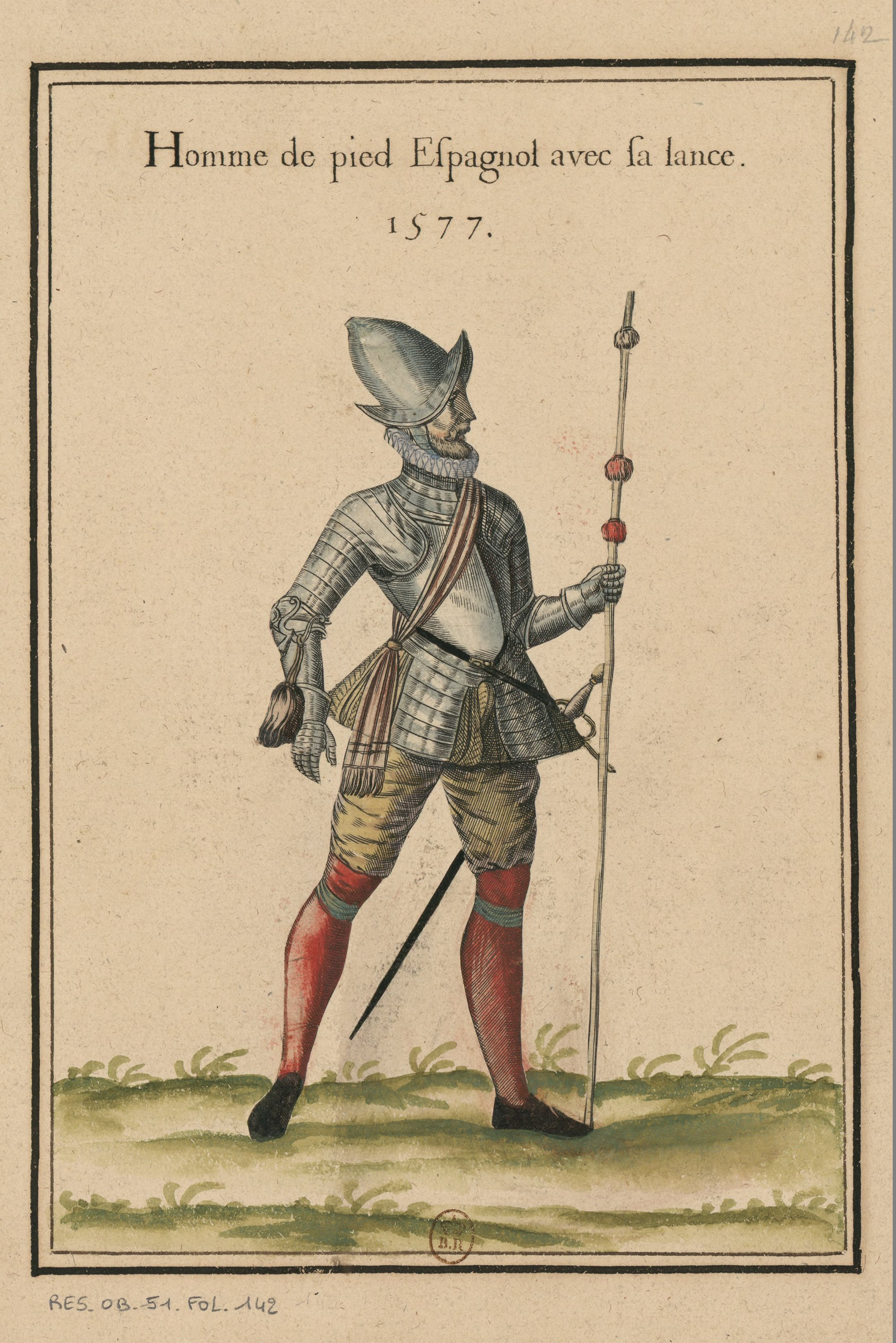
Spanish footman with a spear (16th century).

The Spanish plan required:

1. to go down to the coast and set up a camp
2. Climb the heights surrounding Algiers, including the walls, and occupying the kasbah heights, overlooking the city, and bombard it with cannons.
3. Wait for the army of the “Sultan” of Ténès, and attack the city violently, while the agents inside plotted to strike the Muslim army from behind.

=== The Battle ===
On September 30, 1516, the Spaniards landed on the coast of Algiers and started to climb the heights around the city divided into four small corps, while the rest of the army advanced towards the main gate. It was a mistake. Oruç left soldiers in the heights who harassed the invaders.

Despite the advice of the governor of the Peñon, Nicolas de Quint, General Diego de Vera imprudently committed all his men, without ensuring his retreat, and occupied a much too extensive line, from the shore, to the place where the kasbah would be later built. His troops, hastily raised and poorly trained recruits, offered little strength.

To make matters worse, the Sultan of Ténès never arrived, which caused the Spanish forces to become shaken, and start falling back to their ships. This was the opportunity Oruç was waiting for; he ordered the troops inside the city to sally out and then attacked the Spanish corps separately with all his might and overthrew them.

The Arab and Bedouin horsemen who, from the beginning of the action had remained posted in compact masses on the neighboring heights, to plunder, according to their custom, the vanquished, rushed the Spaniards as soon as they saw them shaken. In a few moments the rout became complete: Diego de Vera was barely able to rally half his army on his ships, and just as the fleet was about to set sail, a terrible storm assailed it and shattered most of his ships and scattered the others; not even a quarter of the expeditionary army returned to Spain.

== Aftermath ==
The Spaniards suffered casualties of 3,000 killed or wounded and 400 captured. In total 8,000 men were lost, and the Algerian forces had few casualties. This defeat increased Oruç's power in Africa, and in Europe the terror he inspired.

Hayreddin succeeded Aruj after the latter was killed in battle against the Spaniards at the fall of Tlemcen, and inherited his nickname, "Barbarossa". The capture of Algiers in 1516 had been made possible with the support of Ottoman Sultan Selim I. This support was discontinued with Sultan Selim's death in 1520, causing Barbarossa to lose the city to a local kabyle chieftain in 1524, and to retreat to his fief of Djidjelli.

== See also ==
- Algiers Expedition (1519)
