= Expedition to Cherchell =

16th c. military action

Date	1516
Location	Cherchell
Result	Principality of Cherchell defeat

Belligerents
Kingdom of Kuku; Barbarossa brothers	Principality of Cherchell

Commanders and leaders
Oruç Reis; Ahmed ou el Kadhi	Kara Hassan (executed)

Units involved
5,000 Kabyles; 800 Turks	Unknown

Casualties and losses
Unknown	Unknown

The Expedition to Cherchell was a joint operation by Ahmad al-Kadi and Arudj Reis who marched on Cherchell with an army of 5,000 Kabyles and 800 Turks to depose its ruler who had founded a small independent sovereignty.

In 1516 the locals of Algiers asked Arudj Reis to liberate them from the tribute payments set by the Spaniards.

Arudj Reis set off with his ally, Ahmad al-Kadi and an army composed of 800 Turks and 5,000 Kabyle auxiliaries. Instead of going straight to Algiers, they went to Cherchell where one of his Reis, Kara Hassan, had founded a small sovereignty. Arudj Reis did not want to leave his flank defenceless, he seized the city, put its sovereign to death and left a garrison.

Following the seizure of Cherchell, Arudj Reis and his ally Ahmad al-Kadi marched on Algiers and seized the city.
