= Siege of Jijel =

Date	1514
Location	Jijel, Algeria
Result	Republic of Genoa defeat

Belligerents
Barbarossa brothers Kingdom of Kuku	Republic of Genoa

Commanders and leaders
Oruç Reis; Ahmed ou el Kadhi	Unknown

Units involved
2,000 Kabyles	Unknown

Casualties and losses
Unknown	Garrison destroyed

The siege of Jijel was a joint operation by the Barbarossa brothers and Ahmad al-Kadi against a Genoese garrison in the city of Jijel.

The Barbarossa brothers had previously attempted to liberate Bougie from its Spanish yoke, however failed on both occasions. On the second occasion Aruj Reis and his ally Ahmad al-Kadi were initially successful, managing to capture the outer castle, however due to the unanswered request for gunpowder from the Hafsid sultan by Aruj Reis, the pair were forced to abandon the operation. Following this event, the inhabitants of Jijel, a city recently captured and garrisoned by the Genoese, requested help from Aruj Reis.

In 1514 Aruj Reis settled in Jijel, he gathered a force of 2,000 Kabyles and with his ally Ahmad al-Kadi, the King of Kuku, he set himself to free Jijel from Genoese occupation. Aruj Reis and Ahmad al-Kadi annihilated the Genoese garrison freeing the city from Genoese occupation and proceeded to fortify it for their benefit. Aruj Reis was thanked by the inhabitants of Jijel and received the title “Sultan of Jijel”.
