= Capture of Béjaïa (1555) =

1555 siege of the city of Béjaïa (in present-day Algeria)

- Part of the Spanish–Ottoman wars
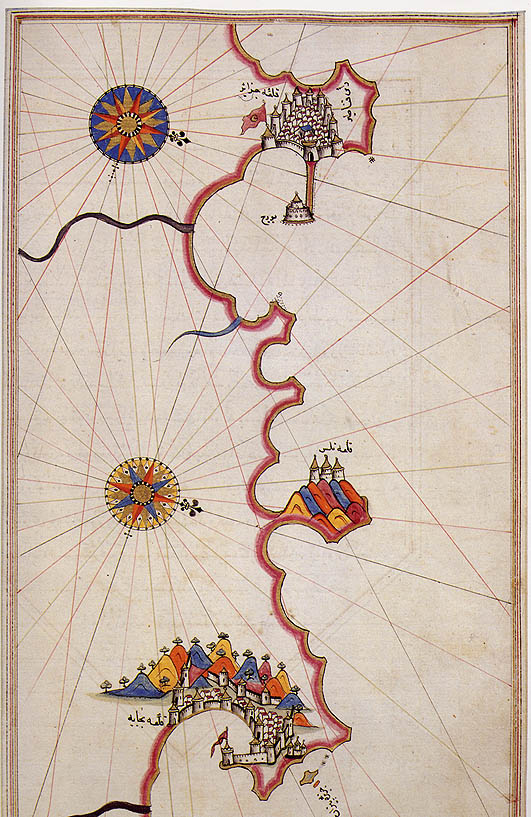
- Historic map of Algiers and Béjaïa by Piri Reis
Date	1555
Location	Béjaïa (in present-day Algeria)
Result	Algerian victory
Territorial changes	Béjaïa under Ottoman rule

Belligerents
Regency of Algiers; Kingdom of Kuku	Spain

Commanders and leaders
Salah Rais; Ahmed ou el Kadhi	(Spain) Luis Peralta (Spain) Alonso Peralta; Andrea Doria (too late to help)

Strength
6,000, including a contingent of 3,000 Kabyles	500–1,000 men

The Capture of Béjaïa or Capture of Bougie occurred in 1555 when Salah Rais, the Ottoman ruler of Algiers, took the city of Béjaïa from the Spaniards. The main fortification in Béjaïa was the Spanish presidio, occupied by about 100 men under first under Luis Peralta, and then his son Alonso Peralta. The city was captured by Salah Rais from his base of Algiers, at the head of several thousand men and a small fleet consisting in two galleys, a barque, and a French saëte ("flèche" or "arrow") requisitioned in Algiers. Peralta had sent messages to Spain for help, and Andrea Doria prepared to leave with a fleet from Naples, but it was too late.

== Background ==
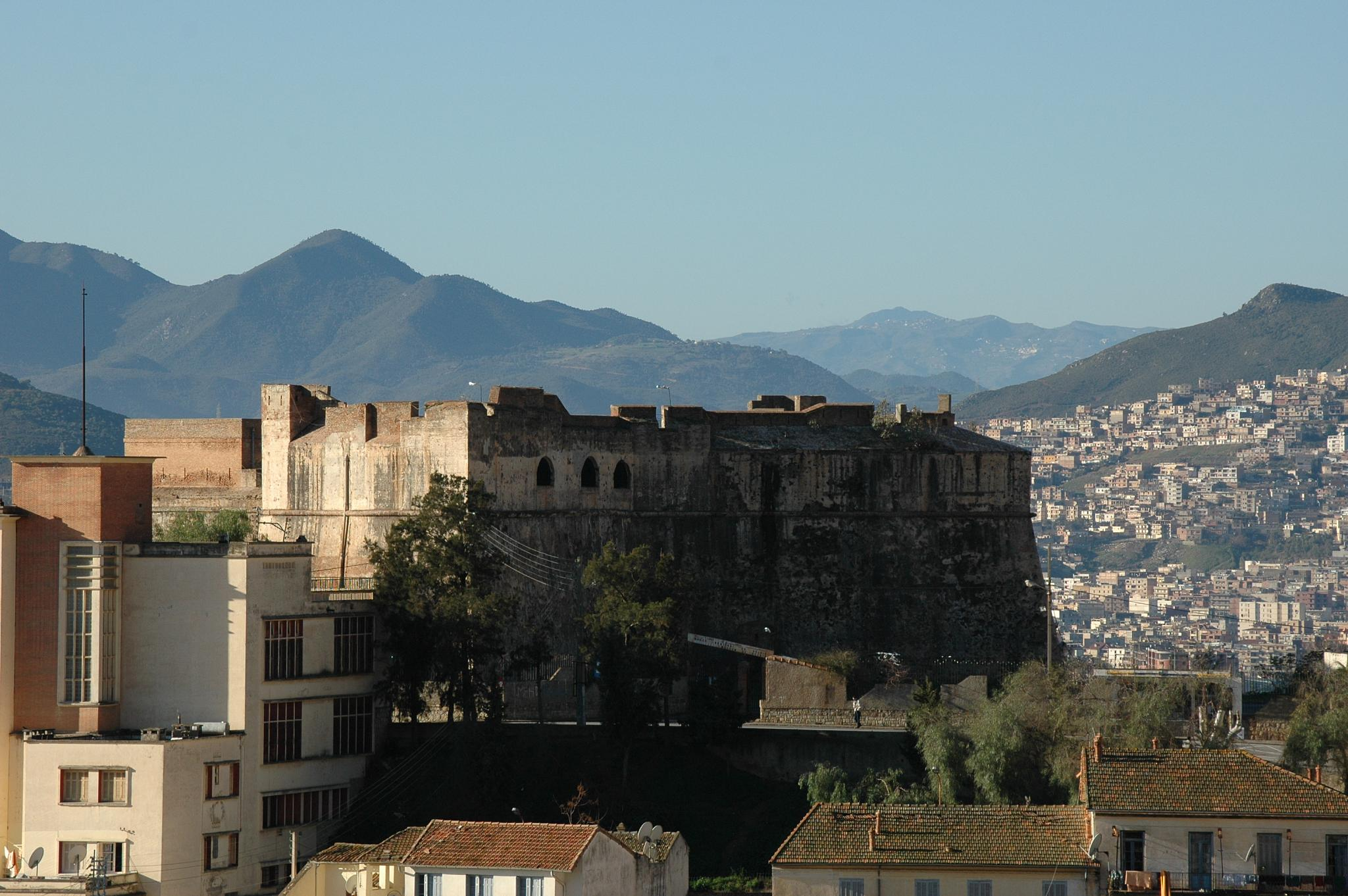
Spanish Fort Barral, also known as bordj Moussa in Bejaia

Former capital of the dissident Hafsid emirs of Bougie, the city was taken by the Spaniards in 1510. Emir Abderrahmane withdrew to the Kalâa of Beni Abbès and established a principality around the fortified city. The sultans of the Kalâa maintain the dream of taking over the city to reconstitute the ancient kingdom of Bougie. In this context, the views of the regency of Algiers on Bougie are perceived, on the one hand as an obstacle for the sultans of the Kalâa and on the other hand as a necessity with a view to holy war and disputes between Christianity and Islam.

== Preparations ==
According to Féraud, the troops of Salah Raïs consist of 4,000 soldiers on land and 22 galleys armed with cannons by sea. A weak Spanish garrison of 500 to 1,000 men was spread over the three main forts of the city, according to Braudel, the Spaniards had a total of 1,000 men and a few dozen horses.

== Battle ==
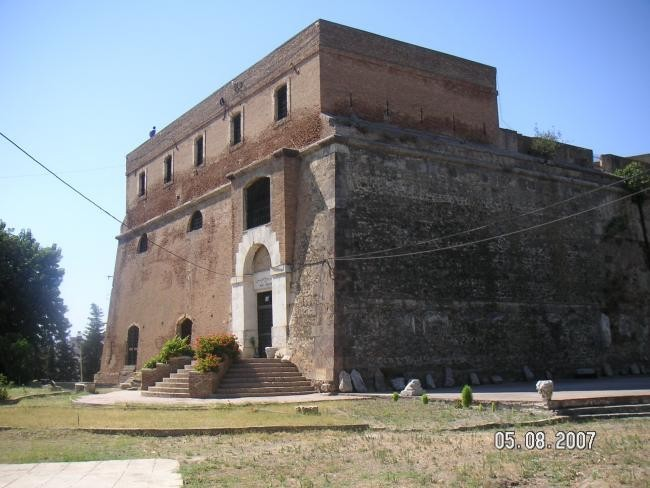
Bordj Moussa

The attack was sudden, galleys bursted into the harbor and bombarded the city. Salah Rais took possession of the plain and the surrounding mountain of Yemma gouraya. The strategy of Salah Raïs aimed to successively beat the forts of the city with artillery: the imperial fort (bordj Moussa), the fort of the sea (bordj Abdelkader) then the Casbah were successively targeted. From the heights a battery first ruined bordj Moussa. It was almost deserted by the Spaniards who were concentrating their forces on the other two forts. Salah Raïs then directed his artillery towards Bordj Abdelkader, defended by around forty soldiers who surrendered after five days of fighting. Governor Don Alfonso de Peralta, surrounded in the Kasbah with the rest of his troops, surrendered on September 27, after 25 days of siege without food or ammunition. The Spanish force was defeated, but Salah Rais promised that Alonso Peralta would be allowed to leave unharmed with 40 men of his choice. According to De Grammont, the promise was violated by the Turks and Kabyles, who captured the soldiers with the exception of don Alonso and Luis. Luis del Mármol Carvajal recounts that the capitulation was given in return for the freedom of all the Spaniards of the place, but according to Minana, the governor only negotiated his freedom and that of his people. On the 28th of September the Algerians indefinitely occupied the city, took a rich booty and divided amongst themselves 600 slaves. Salah Raïs taking prisoner all the Spaniards in the place with the exception of Governor Peralta and his retinue was therefore considered, according to Marmol's version, as having breached his word. Don Alfonso de Peralta returned to Spain aboard a French caravel, he was severely criticized and was eventually arrested by order of Charles V for his failure and was executed in the main square of Valladolid.

== Consequences ==
The capture of Béjaïa permitted the Ottomans to encircle the Spanish position at Goletta and that of their ally Ahmad Sultan in Tunis, as they now had strong bases in Béjaïa and Tripoli. The recovered city quickly became a point of disagreement between the kingdom of Beni Abbès (descendant of the local Hafsid emirs who reigned over the city before the Spanish conquest of 1509) and Salah Raïs who wanted to ensure its direct administration. This taking possession of the city of Bougie by the regency of Algiers ruined the hopes of the Sultan of Kalâa to restore the old medieval kingdom of Béjaïa. He also established an alliance with the Sultan of Koukou to counterbalance the hostility of Abdelaziz El Abbes. Salah Raïs entrusted Kuku with the immediate hinterland, including the strategic supply of wood (qarasta) for the city and shipbuilding.
