= Battle of Oued Djer =

16th c. military action

Date	1517
Location	Oued Djer, Algeria
Result	Algerian victory

Belligerents
Sultanate of Algiers; Kingdom of Kuku	Spanish Oran; Sheikhdom of Ténès

Commanders and leaders
Oruç Reis; Ahmed ou el Kadhi	Hamid ben Abid

Units involved
A large contingent of Kabyles; 1,500 armed Moors from Spain or Janissaries	8,000–10,000 Arabs

Casualties and losses
Unknown	Unknown

The Battle of Oued Djer occurred in 1517 after the locals of Ténès called upon Arudj Reis to remove its ruler who was a Spanish agent and had occupied the city with the help of the Spanish.

In 1516 Arudj Reis and his ally Ahmad al-Kadi seized Cherchell and Algiers with an army composed of 800 Turks and 5,000 Kabyle auxiliaries. Following the seizure of Algiers, the Spanish sent a force against him but this Spanish force was defeated in the Algiers expedition of 1516.

The local population of Ténès called upon Arudj Reis to remove its ruler, who occupied the city with the help of the Spaniards. Arudj Reis set out with an almost entirely Kabyle army. Approximately 8,000 or 10,000 Arabs were assembled by the Sultan of Tenes, who was a Spanish agent. The Sultan of Ténès, Hamid Ben Abid, hastened to attack Arudj Reis. Due to his relations with the Spaniards of Oran, Arudj Reis was determined to make an example out of him. He left his brother Hayreddin in Algiers as its governor and set out with 1500 armed Moors from Spain or Janissaries and a large contingent of Kabyles. The battle took place at the banks of Oued Djer, near Blida, and Arudj Reis defeated his enemy and pursued them as far as Ténès, which was seized without resistance. Médéa and Miliana were also captured.

Arudj Reis would eventually seize Tlemcen upon the request of its inhabitants to remove its Spanish yoke.
