= Battle of Issers =

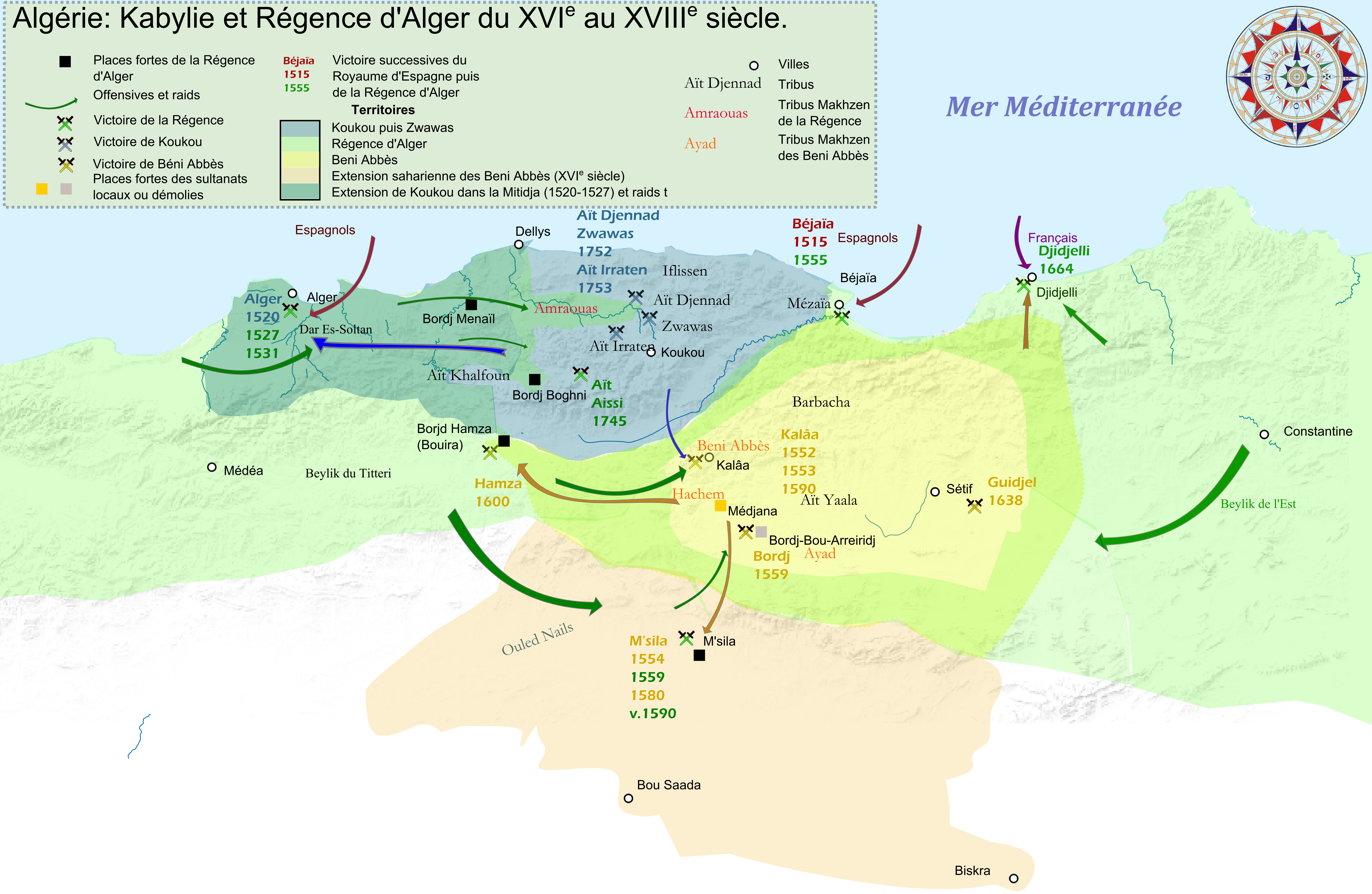
Date	1519
Location	Issers
Result	Victory of the Kingdom of Kuku

Belligerents
Hafsid dynasty Kingdom of Kuku	Sultanate of Algiers

Commanders and leaders
Ahmed Ou Lqadi	Hayreddin Barbarossa

Units involved
Unknown	Unknown

Casualties and losses
Unknown	Unknown

The Battle of Issers was a conflict that took place in 1519 between the forces of Sultan Ahmed of Kuku and Hayreddin Barbarossa of the Sultanate of Algiers.

In 1518 Sultan Ahmed and Oruç Reis led a joint expedition against the Spaniards in Tlemcen which failed and resulted in the death of Oruç Reis. Hayreddin Barbarossa resented Ahmed as his troops had seemingly abandoned Oruç Reis.

Hayreddin Barbarossa assumed military command of Algiers and immediately organised an expedition against Sultan Ahmed which led to a sharp conflict. The Hafsids had sent reinforcements to Ahmed. Sultan Ahmed attacked the troops of the Sultanate of Algiers from behind and inflicted heavy losses on the army of Hayreddin Barbarossa. The battle was described as bloody. Sultan Ahmed won the battle and went on to capture Algiers the following year.
