= Battle of Piombino Channel =

1518 Tunisian corsair victory over the Papal States

Battle of Piombino Channel (1518)
- Part of Barbary corsairs
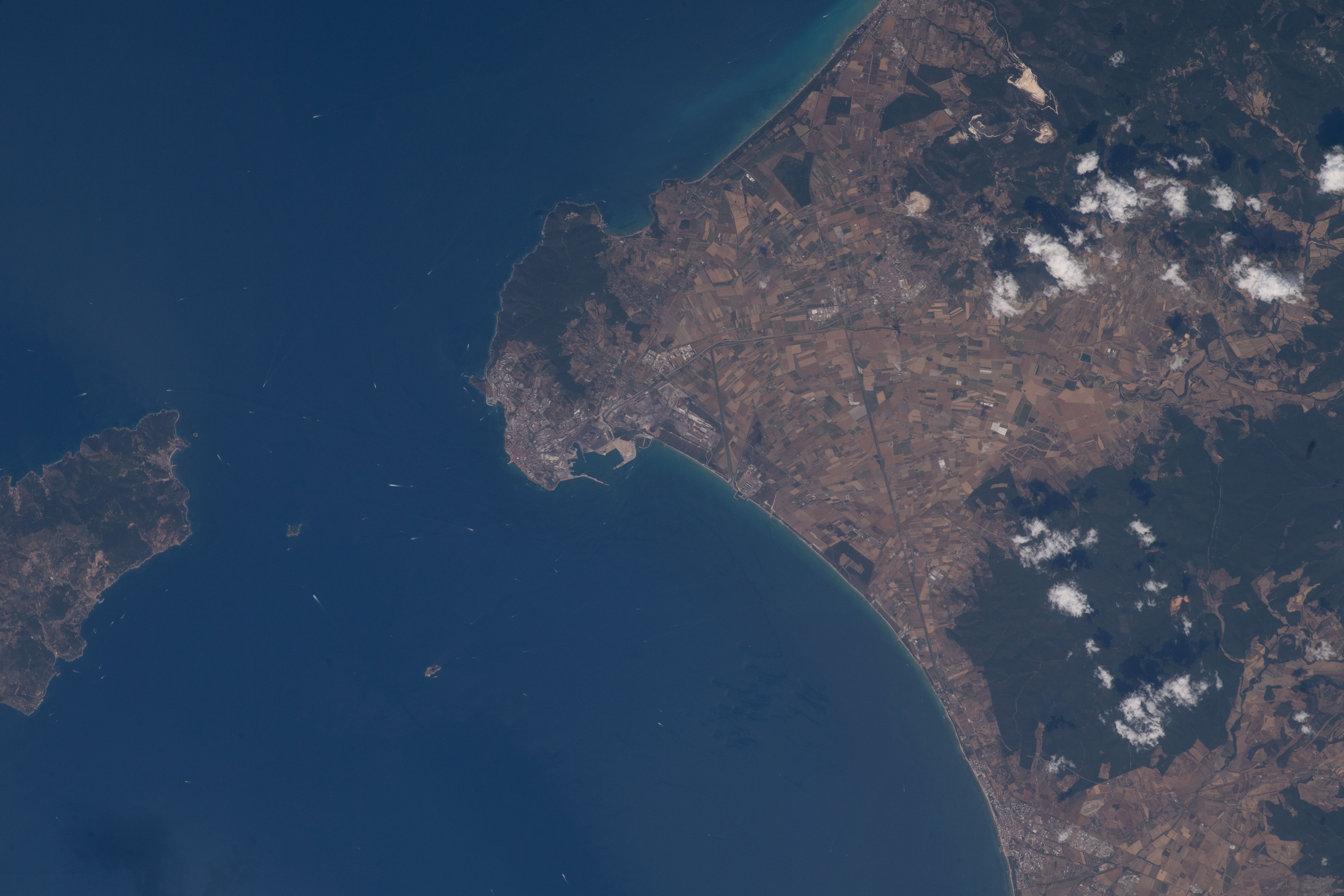
- View of Piombino Channel
Date	Mid-September 1518
Location	Near Piombino, Mediterranean Sea
Result	Tunisan victory

Belligerents
Papal States	Tunisan Corsairs

Commanders and leaders
(Papal States) Paolo Vettori (POW)	Kaid Ali

Strength
3 galleys	12 ships

Casualties and losses
1 galley captured All but 7 killed	Unknown

The Battle of Piombino Channel was a military engagement between the Papal fleet and the Tunisian corsairs. The Papal fleet was ambushed by the Corsairs, losing their flagship and the capture of their commander.

== Background ==
In the year 1504, the commander of the Papal fleet, Paolo Vettori, was captured by the Barbary corsairs led by Aruj Barbarossa. Paolo and the other men captured were ransomed for 200,000 ducats. Despite this, Paolo was reappointed as the commander of Papal fleets. In the spring of 1518, Paolo resumed his navigation. The entire summer was spent chasing a Barbary corsair named Kaid Ali, or Gaddali. Paolo commanded 3 galleys.

== Battle ==
In mid-September, Paolo spotted two ships in the Piombino Channel. They belonged to Gaddali. The two ships fled, and Paolo chased them with his flagship without the rest of the Papal galleys. The Barbary corsairs then stopped and allowed themselves to be run over. The Papal troops began boarding one of the ships, and a fierce fight ensued. During the battle, 10 more Barbary ships suddenly appeared from the channel and surrounded the papal flagship. It was a trap. By the time Paolo's troops captured the enemy ship. The Barbary corsairs surrounded his ship. After a desperate fight, Paolo's troops were overwhelmed and massacred. Paolo was wounded in the fight and captured. The rest of the Papal galleys did nothing to help and escaped. Only 7 men survived and escaped using a skiff.

== Aftermath ==
Paolo would be enslaved for the second time. He was ransomed by a Venetian merchant in Tunis. Despite his capture, Paolo would remain the commander of the Papal galleys.

== Sources ==
- Alberto Guglielmotti (1876), The Pirate War and the Papal Navy from 1500 to 1560 (In Italian).
- Oreste Tommasini (1911), The life and writings of Niccolò Machiavelli in relation to Machiavellianism (In Italian).
- Gordon Ellyson Abercrombie (2024), The Hospitaller Knights of Saint John at Rhodes 1306-1522.
