= Expedition to the Moulouya =

Date	1517
Location	Moulouya, Morocco
Result	Arudj Reis pushes his conquests to the Moulouya; Beni Amer and Beni Snassen recognise the authority of Arudj Reis
Territorial changes	Tibda, Oujda and Debdou captured and garrisoned

Belligerents
Sultanate of Algiers	Beni Amer; Beni Snassen

Commanders and leaders
Oruç Reis	Unknown

The Expedition to the Moulouya was an expedition conducted by Arudj Reis after he seized Tlemcen and the Mechouar from its Spanish client with the help of his ally, Ahmad al-Kadi.

Arudj Reis and Ahmad al-Kadi acted on the request of Tlemcen's inhabitants to free the city of its Spanish yoke. They scored a victory at Sidi Bel Abbess and seized the city of Tlemcen.

Following the usurpation of Tlemcen, Arudj Reis made conquests in the eastern lands of Morocco. He pushed his conquests to the Moulouya. He captured and garrisoned Tibda, Oujda and Debdou. He then conducted raids in the lands of the Beni Snassen and forced the Beni Amer and Beni Snassen to recognise his authority and imposed a tribute on them.

After these successes, the Spanish sought to take back Tlemcen and restore a client ruler, this ultimately resulted in the Fall of Tlemcen (1518).
