= Algiers expedition (1519) =

Joint Spanish-Italian attack on Algiers

- Part of Spanish–Ottoman wars
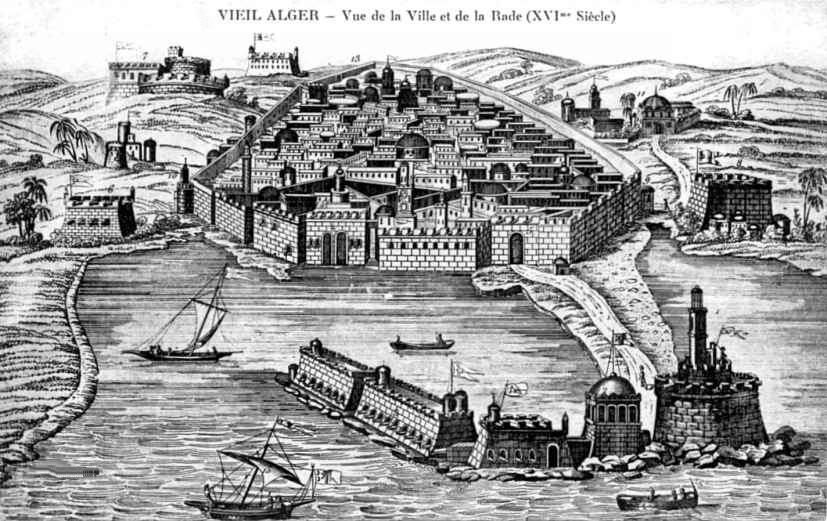
- Algiers in 16th century
Date	24 August – 3 September 1519
Location	Algiers
Result	Algerian victory

Belligerents
(Spain) Spanish Empire; Kingdom of Sicily	Sultanate of Algiers

Commanders and leaders
Hugo of Moncada; Don Martin d'Argote	Hayreddin Barbarossa

Strength
Strength according to Clodfelter: 58 ships 23,000 soldiers Strength according to Manfroni: 80 sailing ships 6,000 men Strength according to Grammont: 40 boats 5,000 men Strength according to the Ghazawat: 170 ships 20,000 men	20,000 Algerians; 600 Turks

Casualties and losses
20 ships sunk 4,000 killed 3,000 captured including 36 high-ranking officers	Unknown

In 1519, a joint Spanish-Italian attack on Algiers was ordered by Charles V and commanded by Hugo of Moncada. The attack was repelled by the Algerians led by Hayreddin Barbarossa.

== Expedition ==
In 1519, the Habsburg emperor, Charles V, ordered an attack on the city of Algiers. The city served as a base for the Ottoman Corsair, Hayreddin Barbarossa. A Spanish expedition was launched from Sicily. The expedition was led by the Admiral of Naples and Hospitaller Knight, Hugo de Moncada, and Don Martin d'Argote.

In mid August the Spanish-Sicilian fleet disembarked by the Oued-El-Harrach. On August 24, the Spanish arrived on the coast of Algiers. They met resistance from the Algerians as they disembarked. After a battle for four or five days, the Spanish managed to occupy a hillock adjacent to the city, the Kudyat al-Sabun, gaining an important position.

The Spanish had a problem. They stayed on the hill for seven days, waiting for reinforcements from their Algerian allies of Tlemcen. The Spanish began harassing Ottoman and Algerian troops with sorties and sniper fire from their high position. The Spanish officers hesitated to attack the city without their allies. They began retreating. However, the retreat ended disastrously. The Algerians began chasing the Spanish and put them on route, massacring them in great numbers before they could re-embark. A furious storm suddenly complicated the retreat. The storm sank many ships and threw their crews on shores, leaving them to be massacred or captured by the Algerians.

Moncada was able to reembark after hiding among the corpses on the shore, leaving the shipwreck survivors to their enemies. The expedition ended on September 3. At the end, the Spanish have lost 20 ships, 4,000 men killed, and 3,000 captured. Among the captured were 36 high-ranking officers.

== Aftermath ==
Barbarossa was furious after his brother's death in 1518 and had little intent to ransom the prisoners. When Charles V offered ransom for the captured prisoners, Barbarossa had all of them executed. When Barbarossa was offered another sum of money for the return of the bodies, he had them thrown into the sea so that “if the relatives of any of the dead came to Algiers, they would not know the burial place of their father or brother, nor be able to see the ashes, but only the waves.”

== See also ==
- Algiers expedition (1516)
- Algiers expedition (1541)

== Sources ==
- Clodfelter, Micheal (24 April 2017). Warfare and Armed Conflicts: A Statistical Encyclopedia of Casualty and Other Figures, 1492-2015. McFarland. ISBN 978-1-4766-2585-0.
- R. B. Merriman (1925), The rise of the Spanish empire in the old world and in the new, Vol. III, The Emperor.
- Gordon Ellyson Abercrombie (2025), The Hospitaller Knights of Saint John at Rhodes 1306-1522.
- Roger Crowley (2009), Empires of the Sea: The Final Battle for the Mediterranean, 1521-1580.
- Si Sheppard (2025), Crescent Dawn: The Rise of the Ottoman Empire and the Making of the Modern Age.
