= Action off Elba (1504) =

Turkish naval victory over the Papal States

- Part of Barbary corsairs
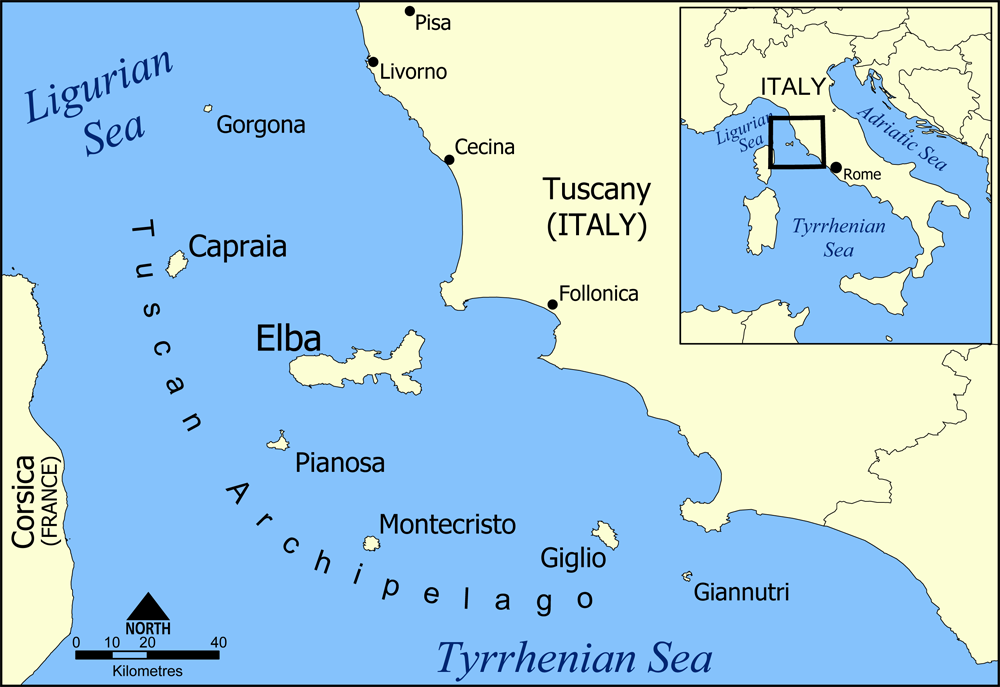
- Elba island
Date	Mid-summer 1504
Location	Elba, Mediterranean Sea
Result	Turkish victory

Belligerents
Papal States	Turkish Corsairs

Commanders and leaders
(Papal States) Paolo Vettori (POW)	Aruj Barbarossa; Hayreddin Barbarossa

Strength
2 galleys	1 galiot

Casualties and losses
2 galleys captured 112 men captured 300 Muslim slaves freed	None

The Action of Elba was a naval engagement between the Barbarossa brothers and the Papal galleys near the island of Elba. The corsairs ambushed two Papal ships and captured them. The engagement was the first naval victory achieved by the Barbarossa brothers.

== Battle ==
In the midsummer of 1504, two papal galleys were sailing in the Tyrrhenian Sea on a voyage from Genoa to Civitavecchia. The two ships were carrying goods of Pope Julius II. They were under the command of a 27-year-old Church captain, Paolo Vettori. The two ships took the route around the top of Elba to the Piombino Channel. Once entering the channel, the papal flagship, Lanterna, encountered a small galiot of 18 banks. Unknown to them, the galiot was a Turkish ship captained by the Barbarossa brothers.

The Turkish galiot showed no signs of retreat. Aruj ordered half of his men to throw their oars overboard, ensuring that none of them would escape if they wanted to. The galiot's prow quickly connected to the galley's quarterdeck. The corsairs began swarming into the galley and fired their muskets and arrows into the unprepared crew. Finding themselves overwhelmed, the crew, including the captain, surrendered. Within minutes, the ship was under Aruj's control. The Lanterna oarsmen were Muslim slaves, and Aruj ordered them to turn the ship around to capture the second one.

Aruj ordered his men to swap clothes with the captured crew to fool the second galley. As the second galley approached, it seemed that the papal flagship had just captured a corsair's ship. As soon as they came next to it, Aruj ordered his men to fire their muskets at them. The papal crew was thrown into confusion, and some of them were killed or wounded. The corsairs then boarded the second ship with little resistance. A total of 112 men were captured. Most were nobles, churchmen, and wealthy merchants. All the Muslim slaves were liberated in the end, numbering 300.

== Aftermath ==
The capture of two papal galleys was a victory for the Barbarossa brothers. The victory caught the attention of European powers and raised the fame of Aruj Barbarossa in the Mediterranean Sea. The Spanish historian Diego de Haedo states that the wonder and astonishment that this notable exploit caused in Tunis, and even in Christendom, is not to be expressed, nor how celebrated the name of Aruj Rais became from that very moment; he being held and accounted, by all the world, as a most valiant and enterprising commander. The papal captives, including the captain, were ransomed for 200,000 Venetian ducats. A similar amount was paid for the ship's goods.

== Sources ==
- Ernle Bradford (1968), The sultan's admiral: the life of Barbarossa.
- Angus Konstam (2016), The Barbary Pirates 15th-17th Centuries.
- Gordon Ellyson Abercrombie (2024), The Hospitaller Knights of Saint John at Rhodes, 1306–1522.
