= Fall of Tlemcen (1518) =

1518 battle of the Ottoman-Habsburg Wars

- Part of Spanish–Ottoman wars
Date	January – May 1518
Location	Tlemcen, Algeria
Result	Hispano-Zayyanid victory
Territorial changes	Tlemcen is recaptured by the Zayyanid Kingdom of Tlemcen

Belligerents
Regency of Algiers; Kingdom of Kuku	Kingdom of Spain; Kingdom of Tlemcen

Commanders and leaders
Oruç Reis †; Ahmed el Kadi	Don Martin d'Argote; Abu Hammou

Strength
6,500 soldiers	10,000 soldiers

The fall of Tlemcen occurred in 1518, when the Ottoman admiral Oruç Barbarossa captured the city of Tlemcen from its sultan, Abu Zayan, the last member of the Banu Zayan lineage.

The fall of Tlemcen followed the capture of Ténès, also by Oruç and his brother, Hayreddin. The Sultan of Tlemcen then fled to Fez in Morocco. Oruç crowned himself king of Tlemcen. The only survivor of Abu Zayan's dynasty was Sheikh Buhammud, who escaped to Oran and called for Spain's assistance.

This victory put Oruç in control of the backcountry behind the Spanish base of Oran, which greatly threatened their usual supply routes. This victory put Oruç in control of a considerable territory, the size of colonial French Algeria.

The Spanish, however, soon reacted in 1518 by launching an attack under the governor Martín d'Argote against Tlemcen, which was 70 miles (110 km) away from Oran, and managed to corner and kill Oruç. They took possession of the region of Tlemcen. According to the diary of Hayreddin Barbarossa, Oruç died as a result of his sympathy for the inhabitants of Algiers and Tlemcen who formed part of his army. Hayreddin declared that Oruç returned to fight with his soldiers until he died, as he could not bear to hear the cries of those who had fallen into the hands of the Spanish forces. Oruç Barbarossa died at age 45 probably near Oujda.

The Spanish continued their offensive stance in the following year with an expedition in 1519 against Algiers led by Hugo de Moncada, however Hayreddin Barbarossa with an army composed of 20,000 Algerians and 800 Turks was able to rout the invading forces.
