= Ait Lqadi =

Kabyle dynasty

Ait Lqadi At Lqaḍi
- Country: Kingdom of Kuku
- Current region: Kabylia
- Origin: Aourir, Ifigha
- Founded: 1515
- Founder: Ahmed Ou Lqadi
- Final ruler: Ali Boukhetouche
- Historic seat: Kuku
- Titles: Agellid of Kuku; Sultan of Algiers
- Deposition: 1730

The Ait Lqadi (Kabyle: At Lqaḍi) were a Kabyle Berber dynasty who originate from the village of Aourir, in the Ait Ghobri (At Ɣebri) tribe and ruled the Kingdom of Kuku. It was founded by Ahmed Ou Lqadi in 1515.

== History ==
=== Origin and name ===
The Ait Lqadi originate from the village of Aourir in the Ait Ghobri tribe. Their lineage goes back to Ahmed Al Ghubrini, a qadi (muslim judge) who originate from the Djurdjura.. His name later gave the name of Ait Lqadi, literally "son of the judge" which became the name of the dynasty.

== Genealogy ==
- Ahmed Al Ghubrini (1264–1314) (indirectly), qadi
  - Ammar Ou Lqadi
    - Ahmed Ou Lqadi (d. 1527), founder of the dynasty and first agellid of Kuku and sultan of Algiers
      - Ahmed Ou Lqadi (d. 1529), agellid of Kuku and sultan of Algiers (1527–1529)
    - Si Hocine Ou Lqadi (d. 1546), agellid of Kuku (1529–1546)
      - Amar Ou Lqadi (d. 1618), agellid of Kuku (1546–1618)
      - Mohand Ou Lqadi, agellid of Kuku (1618–?)
        - ? Ahmed Boukhetouche (d. 1696), agellid of Kuku (–1696)
          - Ali Boukhetouche, agellid of Kuku (1669–1730)
          - Orkho Boukhetouche
