= Capture of Béjaïa (1510) =

- Part of Spanish campaigns in the Maghreb (1497–1535)
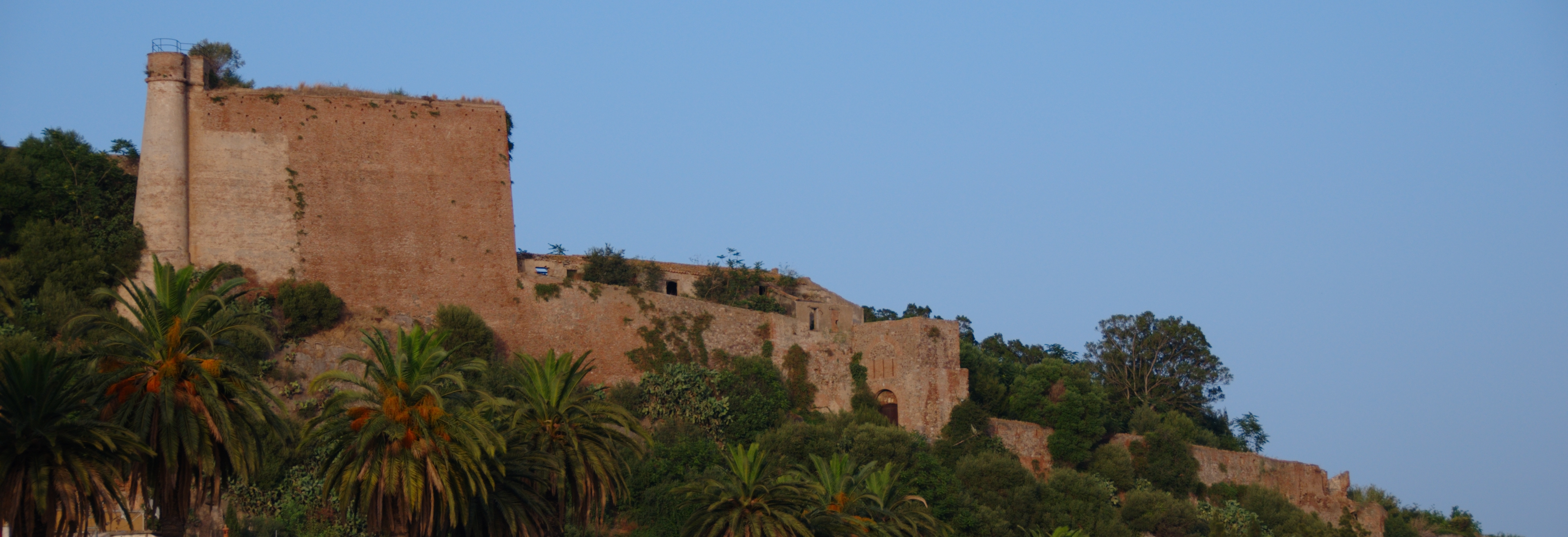
- The fort of Béjaïa
Date	1510
Location	Béjaïa
Result	Spanish victory

Belligerents
Emirate of Béjaïa	Spanish Empire

Commanders and leaders
Abdelaziz Hafsi	Pedro Navarro

Strength
10,000 men	5,000 men 13 ships

Casualties and losses
300 dead 200 captured	Unknown

The Spanish Empire captured Béjaïa (also known as Bougie) in 1510, then an emirate ruled by a branch of the Hafsid dynasty. The Spanish lost the city again 45 years later to Salah Rais and the Kingdom of Kuku in the Capture of Bougie (1555).

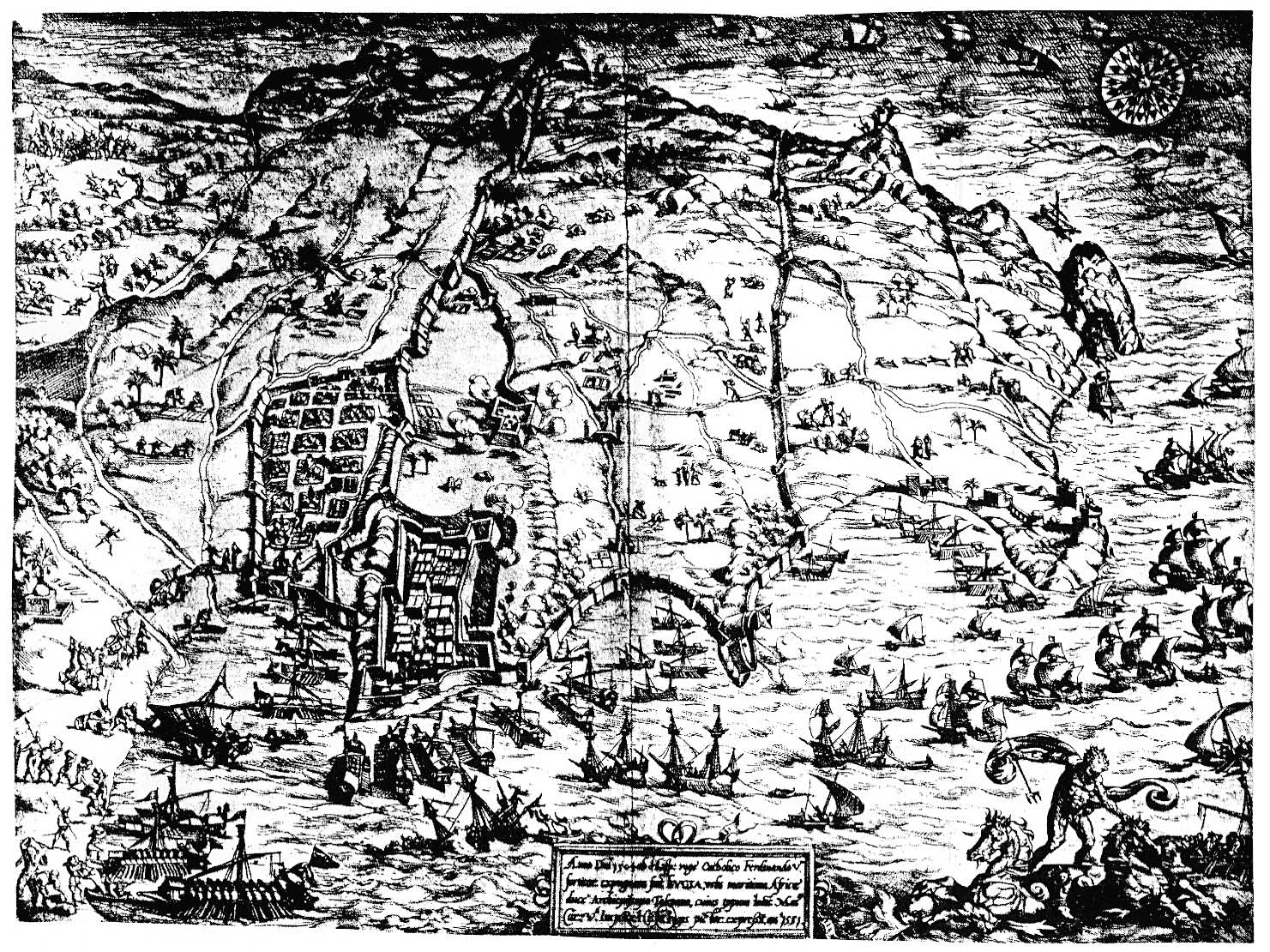
Béjaïa 1551

== Background ==
According to Leo the African, the city of Béjaïa was surrounded by an ancient wall and had colleges where law and mathematics are taught, mosques, souks, and hospitals serving a population estimated at "8000 hearths”.

Towards the end of the fifteenth century, Muslims were driven out of Spain by the Catholic Monarchs and took refuge in cities on the coast of North Africa such activities Oran, Algiers and Béjaïa. From these bases they organised corsair attacks from these places harassing the Spaniards and damaging their trade. In Béjaïa, Sultan Abdelaziz withdrew the commercial privileges enjoyed by the Catalan merchants in 1473. He also sent reinforcements to the Zayyanid rulers of Mers el-Kébir and Oran when they were attacked by the Spanish.

In 1509, after the taking of Oran, Cardinal Cisneros commissioned Pedro Navarro, to seize several other places on the Algerian coast used by the corsairs. Navarro set sail for Béjaïa on 1 January 1510. On 5 January the squadron reaches the city. Spanish and Arab or Spanish sources diverge appreciably on several points concerning the battle that followed.

== Account in Spanish sources ==
Pedro Navarro landed his forces and began moving towards Gouraya mountain where Sultan Abdelaziz had taken up a position with a large number of soldiers. Surprised by this daring movement, Abdelaziz's soldiers abandoned their positions and were pursued by the Spaniards. Spanish forces soon attacked the city walls and managed to enter the city without difficulty. The population fled from the other side of the city, believing that the Spanish only intended to loot the place and would then retreat. They made for Sultan Abdelaziz’s camp, leaving the Spanish to take immense booty.

== Account in Arab sources ==
The Spaniards disembarked at the site of the old port, near the tomb of Sheikh Aïssa es-Sebouki. The sultan had allocated this district to Muslims driven out of Spain because there was not enough space within the city walls. The gardens on the other side of the city, on the side of the "wadi el Kebir" (wadi Soummam) were also inhabited by Andalusians.

When the Spaniards disembarked, they sent emissaries to the city to call for its surrender. The call was rejected so while the inhabitants prepared their defences the Spanish erected a palisade from the Sidi Aïssa district to the sea. They also took up positions on the mountain from where they trained their artillery on anyone attempting to escape. They held these positions for ten days. The narrator Abu Mohammed ben Abd el-Hak described the sequence of events as follows:

“The enemy was fortified in his entrenchments in the district of Sidi Aïssa, for twenty-one days, receiving the necessary water and provisions by vessel from Oran. It is from there that they drew their daily reinforcements in men and their provisions in food and ammunition. Throughout this period, the struggle was fierce between the combatants. One night, among other things, a troop of townspeople experienced a great disaster. The bravest warriors, numbering five hundred and twenty, organized a sortie. Some took to boats to attack by sea, while their companions attempted to outflank the positions on the top of the mountain. The latter left through the Amsiouen and Sadat gates. I was among those who attacked by sea; but during that night a considerable number of Muslims succumbed. Those who came by sea suffered few losses, because after making a few captures, they managed to row away quickly, and take shelter.

The next day, a great panic broke out in the city as a result of lamentations and cries of despair from the families of those who had succumbed in the attack directed from the side of the mountain. It was on this day that the Emir Abou Fares, son of Sultan Abd el-Aziz, arrived, bringing troops from the countryside. The two sons of the Sultan, Abou Fares and Abou Abdallah, mingled with the fighters for the holy war, accompanied by four main ulema of the city. The number of fighters was great but their exact number was not known. They took up a position in the gardens below the city. The troops made an exit through the Amsiouen and Sadat gates and attacked in two groups, one by the mountain and the sea. They succeeded in forcing the Spanish positions as far as the Sidi Aïssa district but the Spaniards suddenly launched a counter-offensive from behind their fence. Driven back to the city walls, the Berber troops suffered many losses. Abu Mohammed ben Othman, imam of the great mosque, reported the number of dead that day as 4,550, including Abou Fares and Abou Abdallah.

Sultan Abdelaziz was informed of the disaster and the course of events since the enemy landing. He refused the proposals for aman (peace) on the advice of Andalusians who considered the word of the Spaniards unreliable, based on their own experience. Sultan Abdelaziz then sent his remaining troops with Arabs and Kabyles from the region as reinforcements. His brother the Emir Abu Bakr, Prince of Constantine, a former rival whom Abdelaziz had defeated and who had withdrawn into the Belezma region began to move forces towards Béjaïa. Chronicles report that Abu Bakr fought fiercely for 8 days, preventing the residents from fleeing and forcing them to resist. This situation continued until the "fifth day of the month of safar in the year 915" (of the Hijrah), i.e. May 25, 1510. The lack of coordination between the troops of Abdelaziz and Abu Bakr allowed the Spaniards to enter the streets of the city and the next day to launch a general assault. The Emir Abou Bakr, fighting near the castle of the Star (site of the current Bordj Moussa) was forced to withdraw or fall into the hands of his enemies. The inhabitants of Béjaïa fled the city as soon as they realized that the Spaniards had prevailed.

== Controversy dating and battle remains ==
The Spanish left an inscription that adorns a door of the Casbah: “FERDINANDVS V REX HISPANIAE INCLITVS VI ARMORVM PERFIDIS AGA RENIS HANC ABSTVLIT VR BEM ANNO MDVIIII (“Ferdinand V, illustrious king of Spain, took this city by force of arms from the perfidious children of Hagar in the year 1509." This inscription gave rise to some scholarly disagreement about the actual date of the expedition, but as the old calendar considered that the new year began in March, the date of 1509 (i.e. early 1510 by modern reckoning) would be consistent with the account in the Spanish sources of the city falling quickly. Since it cannot be reconciled with the May date for the fall of the city given in Arab sources, it has been suggested that the inscription refers to the date Ferdinand authorised the expedition, or the date it departed, rather than the fall of the city.

== Aftermath ==
After the city’s fall Emir Abu Bakr wanted to continue the war against the Spaniards, and organized a around it. He also killed his brother Sultan Abdelaziz in battle at Takerkat. Abu Bakr takes the title of sultan, against the advice of the Hafsid sheikhs who preferred Abdelaziz’s son Abbas. Abbas however sought to ally himself with the Spaniards to take back his title of sultan of Bougie from Abou Bakr. Unsuccessful in this eventually founded his own principality, the Kingdom of Ait Abbas.

Abu Bakr continued to try to retake Béjaïa. The Spanish reduced the perimeter of the walls to make it easier to defend. One of Abu Bakr's raids succeeded in penetrating the city, in the district of Bab el Bounoud and in 1512, Abu Bakr called upon the Barbarossa corsairs to attempt a siege of the city combining land and sea.
