= Aruj Barbarossa =

Ottoman corsair, later Sultan of Algiers (c. 1474–1518)

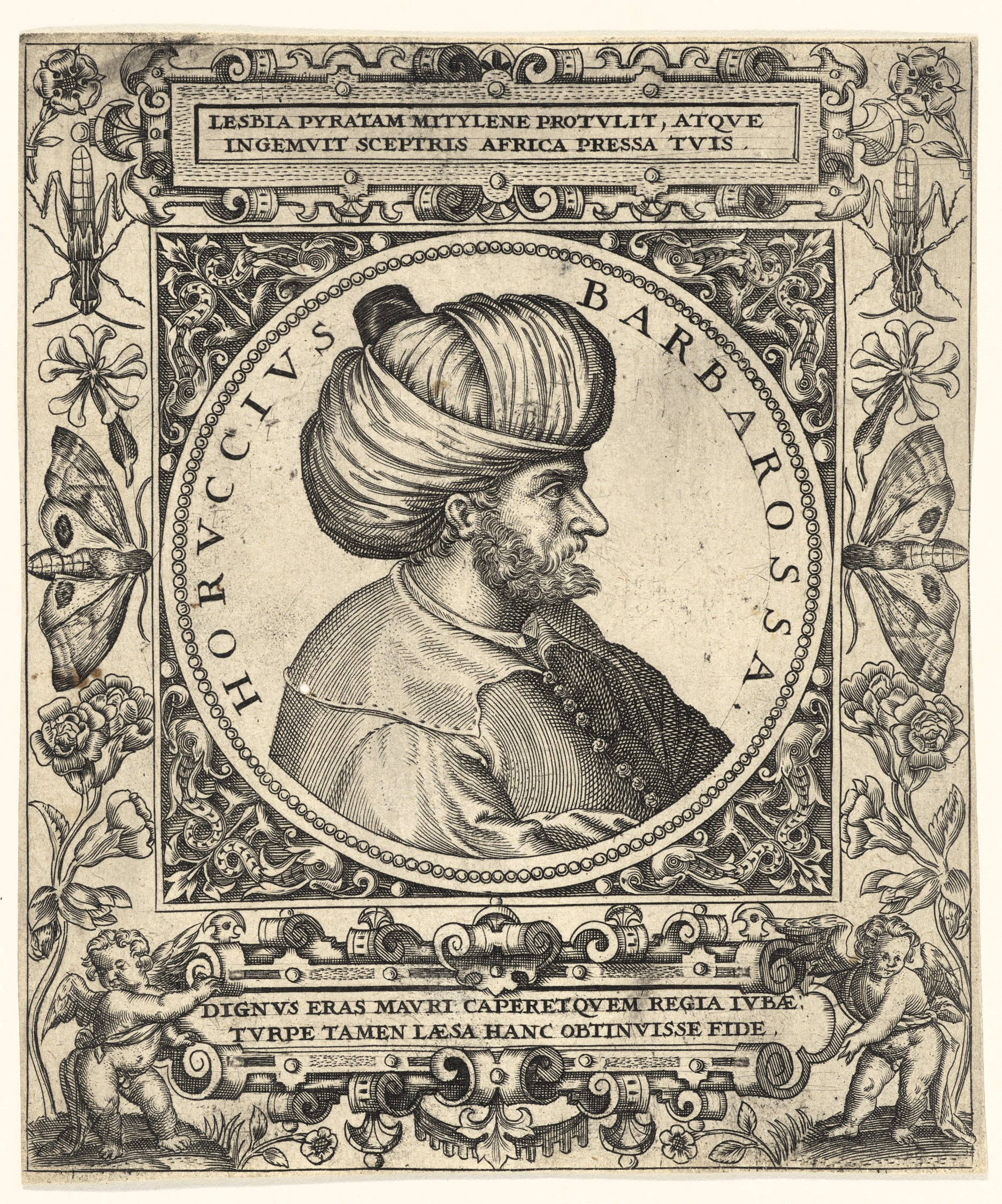
- Copper engraving of Aruj Barbarossa by Theodor de Bry, 16th century

Beylerbey of Algiers
- In office 1517–1518
- Preceded by: Position established
- Succeeded by: Hayreddin Barbarossa

Personal details
- Born: Aruj Barbarossa c. 1474 Lesbos, Ottoman Empire
- Died: May 1518 (aged 43–44) Oujda
- Occupation: Sultan and Corsair

Military service
- Allegiance: Ottoman Empire; Regency of Algiers
- Branch/service: Ottoman Navy
- Years of service: c. 1495 – 1518
- Rank: Reis
- Battles/wars: Action off Elba (1504); Siege of Jijel; Expedition to Cherchell; Capture of Algiers (1516); Algiers expedition (1516); Battle of Oued Djer; Expedition to the Moulouya; Fall of Tlemcen (1518)

Aruj Barbarossa (Arabic: عروج بربروس; c. 1474 – May 1518), known as Oruç Reis to the Turks, was an Ottoman corsair who became Sultan of Algiers. The elder brother of the famous Ottoman admiral Hayreddin Barbarossa, he was born on the Ottoman island of Midilli (Lesbos in present-day Greece) and died in battle against the Spanish at Tlemcen.

He became known as Baba Aruj (Father Aruj) when he transported large numbers of Morisco, Muslim and Jewish refugees from Spain to North Africa; in Europe he was known as Barbarossa.

== Background ==
His father, Yakup Ağa, was an Ottoman official of Turkish or Albanian descent. Yakup Ağa took part in the Ottoman conquest of Lesbos (Midilli) from the Genoese in 1462, and as a reward, was granted the fief of the Bonova village in the island. He married a local Christian Greek woman (from Mytilene), named Katerina, who was the widow of an Eastern Orthodox priest.

They had two daughters and four sons: Ishak, Aruj, Hızır and Ilyas. Yakup became an established potter and purchased a boat to trade his products. The four sons helped their father with his business, but not much is known about the daughters. At first Aruj helped with the boat, while Hızır helped with pottery.

== Early career ==
All four brothers became seamen, engaged in marine affairs and international sea trade. Aruj was the first brother to be involved in seamanship, soon joined by the youngest brother Ilyas. Hızır initially helped their father in the pottery business, but later obtained a ship of his own and also began a career at sea. Ishak, the eldest, remained on Mytilene and was involved with the financial affairs of the family business. The other three brothers initially worked as sailors, but then turned privateers in the Mediterranean, counteracting the privateering of the Knights Hospitaller of the Island of Rhodes. Aruj and Ilyas operated in the Levant, between Anatolia, Syria and Egypt, while Hızır operated in the Aegean Sea and based his operations mostly in Thessaloniki.

Aruj was a very successful seaman. He also learned to speak Italian, Spanish, French, Greek and Arabic in the early years of his career. During a trading expedition in Tripoli, Lebanon, he and Ilyas were attacked by a galley of the Knights Hospitaller. Ilyas was killed in the fight, and Aruj was wounded. Their father's boat was captured, and Aruj was taken prisoner and detained in the Knights' Bodrum Castle for nearly three years. Hizir tried to help Oruc by ransoming but failed and Oruc was tortured for the first few years of captivity and later he worked as a slave on the Rhodes Ship which transported prisoners. One night when conditions were favorable he managed to escape from the ship and was able to flee to a village where he lived for ten days. Later he joined Captain Ali.

== Aruj the corsair ==
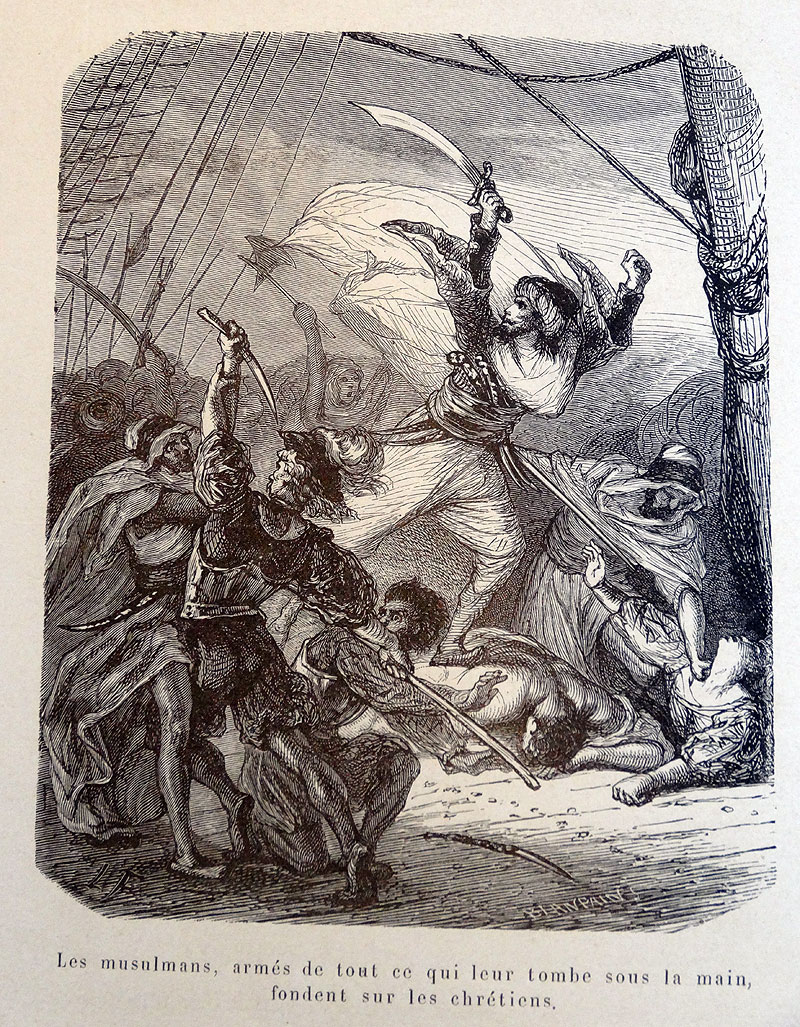
Aruj captures a galley

Aruj later went to Antalya, where he was given 18 galleys by Şehzade Korkut, an Ottoman prince and governor of the city, and charged with fighting against the Knights Hospitaller who inflicted serious damage on Ottoman shipping and trade.

In the following years, when Şehzade Korkut became governor of Manisa, he gave Aruj a larger fleet of 24 galleys at the port of İzmir and ordered him to participate in the Ottoman naval expedition to Apulia in the Kingdom of Naples, where Aruj bombarded several coastal forts and captured two ships. On his way back to Lesbos, he stopped at Euboea and captured three galleons and another ship. He then attacked several islands of the Knights Hospitaller and captured many of their small vessel ships. Reaching Mytilene with these captured vessels, Aruj learned that Şehzade Korkut, brother of the new Ottoman sultan, had fled to Egypt to avoid being killed over a succession dispute; a common practice at that time in the House of Osman. Fearing trouble due to his well-known association with the Ottoman prince in exile, Aruj sailed to Egypt where he met Şehzade Korkut in Cairo and managed to get an audience with the Mamluk Sultan Qansuh al-Ghawri, who gave him another ship and charged him to raid the coasts of Italy and the islands of the Mediterranean that were controlled by Christian powers. After passing the winter in Cairo, he set sail from Alexandria and operated along the coasts of Liguria and Sicily.

In 1503, Aruj managed to seize three more ships and made the island of Djerba his new base, thus moving his operations to the Western Mediterranean. Hızır joined Aruj at Djerba. In 1504, the two brothers asked Abu Abdallah Muhammad IV al-Mutawakkil, Hafsid caliph of Tunisia, for permission to use the strategically located port of La Goulette for their operations. They were granted this right, with the condition of leaving one third of their booty to the sultan.

Aruj, in command of small galliots, captured two much larger Papal galleys near the island of Elba. Later, near Lipari, the two brothers captured a Sicilian warship, the Cavalleria, with 380 Spanish soldiers and 60 Spanish knights from Aragon on board, who were on their way from Spain to Naples. In 1505, they raided the coasts of Calabria. These accomplishments increased their fame and they were joined by a number of other well-known Muslim corsairs, including Kurtoğlu (known in the West as Curtogoli) a Turkish corsair from Kayseri. In 1508, they raided the coasts of Liguria, particularly Diano Marina.

In 1509, Ishak also left Mytilene and joined his brothers at La Goulette. The fame of Aruj increased when, between 1504 and 1510, he transported Muslims from Spain to North Africa. His helping the Muslims of Spain in need and transporting them to safer lands earned him the honorific name Baba Aruj (Father Aruj), which eventually—due to the similarity in sound—evolved in Spain, Italy and France into Barbarossa (Redbeard in Italian).

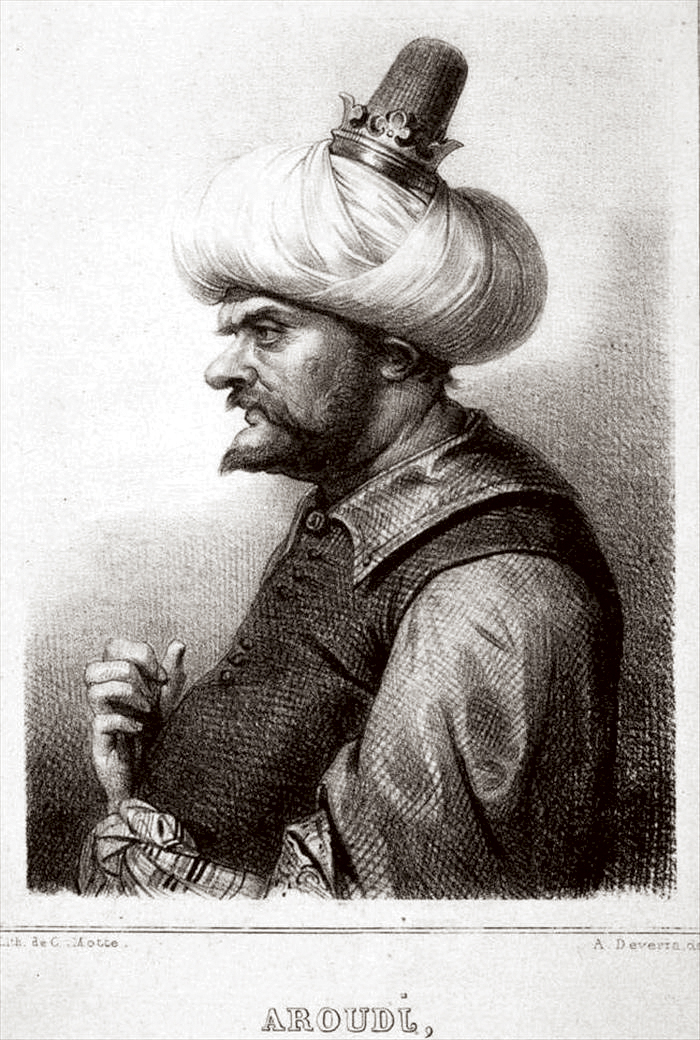
A drawing of Aruj

In 1510, the three brothers raided Cape Passero in Sicily and repulsed a Spanish attack on Bougie, Oran and Algiers. In August 1511, they raided the areas around Reggio Calabria in southern Italy. In August 1512, the exiled ruler of Bougie invited the brothers to drive out the Spaniards, and during the battle Aruj lost his left arm. This incident earned him the nickname Gümüş Kol (Silver Arm in Turkish), in reference to the silver prosthetic device which he used in place of his missing limb. Later that year the three brothers raided the coasts of Andalusia in Spain, capturing a galliot of the Lomellini family of Genoa who owned the Tabarca island in that area. They subsequently landed on Menorca and captured a coastal castle, and then headed towards Liguria and captured four Genoese galleys near Genoa. The Genoese sent a fleet to liberate their ships, but the brothers captured their flagship as well. After capturing a total of 23 ships in less than a month, the brothers sailed back to La Goulette.

There they built three more galliots and a gunpowder production facility. In 1513, they captured four English ships on their way to France, raided Valencia where they captured four more ships, and then headed for Alicante and captured a Spanish galley near Málaga. Between 1513 and 1514, the three brothers engaged Spanish squadrons on several other occasions and moved to their new base in Cherchell, west of Algiers. In 1514, with 12 galliots and 1,000 Turks, they destroyed two Spanish fortresses at Bougie, and when a Spanish fleet under the command of Miguel de Gurrea, viceroy of Mallorca, arrived for assistance, they headed towards Ceuta and raided that city before capturing Jijel in Algeria, which was under Genoese control. They later captured Mahdiya in Tunisia. Afterwards they raided the coasts of Sicily, Sardinia, the Balearic Islands and the Spanish mainland, capturing three large ships there. In 1515, they captured several galleons, a galley and three barques at Mallorca. Still in 1515, Aruj sent precious gifts to the Ottoman Sultan Selim I who, in return, sent him two galleys and two swords embellished with diamonds. In 1516, joined by Kurtoğlu, the brothers besieged the Castle of Elba, before heading once more towards Liguria where they captured 12 ships and damaged 28 others.

== Ruler of Algiers ==
In 1516 the three brothers succeeded in liberating Jijel and Algiers from the Spaniards, but eventually assumed control over the cities and surrounding region, forcing the previous ruler, Abu Hammu Musa III of the Zayyanid dynasty, to flee. The local Spaniards in Algiers sought refuge in the Peñón of Algiers and asked Emperor Charles V, King of Spain, to intervene, but the Spanish fleet failed to force the brothers out of Algiers.

After consolidating his power and declaring himself the new Sultan of Algiers, Aruj sought to enhance his territory inlands and took Miliana, Medea and Ténès. He became known for attaching sails to cannons for transport through the deserts of North Africa. In 1517, the brothers raided Capo Limiti and later the town of Isola di Capo Rizzuto in Calabria.

Aruj Barbarossa made conquests in the eastern lands of Morocco, in 1518 he conquered and garrisoned Oujda and Tibda, he submitted the Beni Amer and Beni Snassen and imposed a tribute on them. He entered negotiations and concluded an alliance with the sultan of Morocco who was extremely frightened by the progress of the Turks.

== Final engagements and death of Aruj and Ishak ==
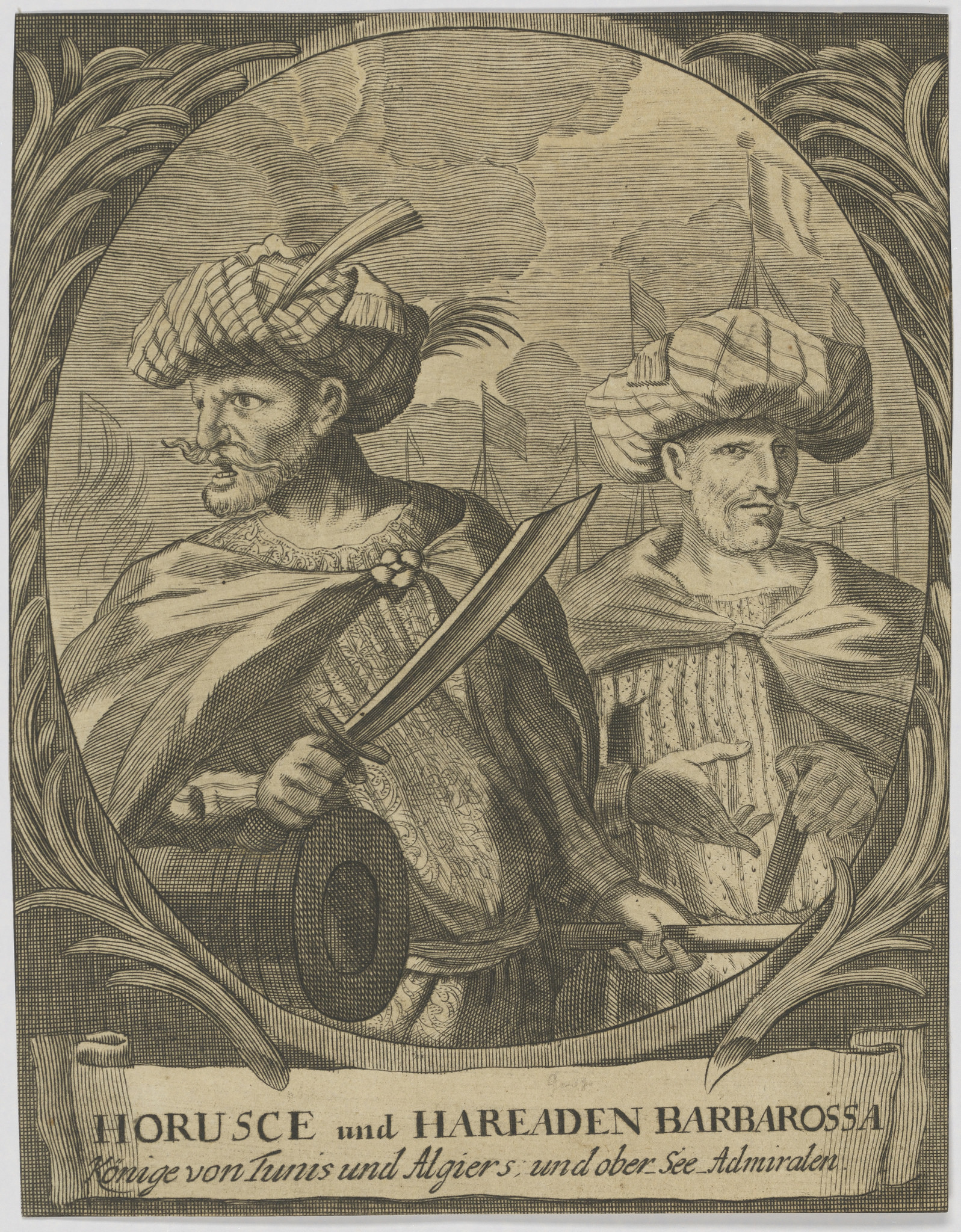
The Barbarossa brothers, Aruj and Hayreddin

The Spaniards ordered Abu Zayan, whom they had appointed as the new ruler of Tlemcen and Oran, to attack Aruj by land, but Aruj learned of the plan and pre-emptively struck against Tlemcen, capturing the city and executing Abu Zayan during the Fall of Tlemcen in 1518. The only survivor of Abu Zayan's dynasty was Sheikh Buhammud, who escaped to Oran and called for Spain's assistance.

In May 1518, Emperor Charles V arrived at Oran and was received there by Sheikh Buhammud and the Spanish governor of the city, Diego de Córdoba, Marquess of Comares, who commanded a force of 10,000 Spanish soldiers. Joined by thousands of Bedouins, the Spaniards marched overland on Tlemcen where Aruj and Ishak awaited them with 1,500 levents soldiers and 5,000 Moorish soldiers. Aruj Barbarossa, who obtained Tlemcen in the east of Algeria, under the domination of Spain, defended the places he had won against the Tlemcen emir, who received help from the Spaniards. He defended his lands for six months. Betrayed by the natives, he tried to break through the enemy siege to return to Algiers.

He broke through the enemy and crossed the river with some of his levents. However, about twenty levents (sailors) remained on the enemy's side. Aruj Barbarossa, knowing that he had no hope of salvation, plunged into his enemies again in order not to leave his levents alone. While trying to cross the river, most of his levents died. One-armed Aruj Barbarossa died as a result of the spear wound he received after seeing the last levent next to him die.

According to the diary of Hayreddin Barbarossa, Oruç died as a result of his sympathies for the inhabitants of Algiers and Tlemcen, who formed part of his army. Hayreddin declared that Oruç returned to fight with his soldiers until he died, as he could not bear to hear the cries of those who had fallen into the hands of the forces of Charles V.

The Spaniards, who wanted to prove the death of Aruj Barbarossa to the King of Spain, cut off the head of the corpse and put it in a bag full of honey and took it to Spain. The reason they did this was because the Spaniards, who had clashed with Aruj Barbarossa many times, reported to the Spanish King that they had killed him, but none of this turned out to be true.

Spanish sources locate the area of his death in Oujda. In an archaeological study conducted by French researcher Graulle, he confirmed that Aruj and his soldiers were buried in the Angad region in Oujda. Skeletons, including one with a severed arm and head, were found in an archaeological mission to the site. Spanish sources such as that of Marmol and Ximenes de Sandoval located his death in the Debdou region.

The last remaining brother, Hızır (Hayreddin Barbarossa), inherited his brother's place, his name (Barbarossa) and his mission and became the most powerful and famous Ottoman admiral by securing the Ottoman dominance over the Mediterranean Sea during the 16th century.

== Legacy ==
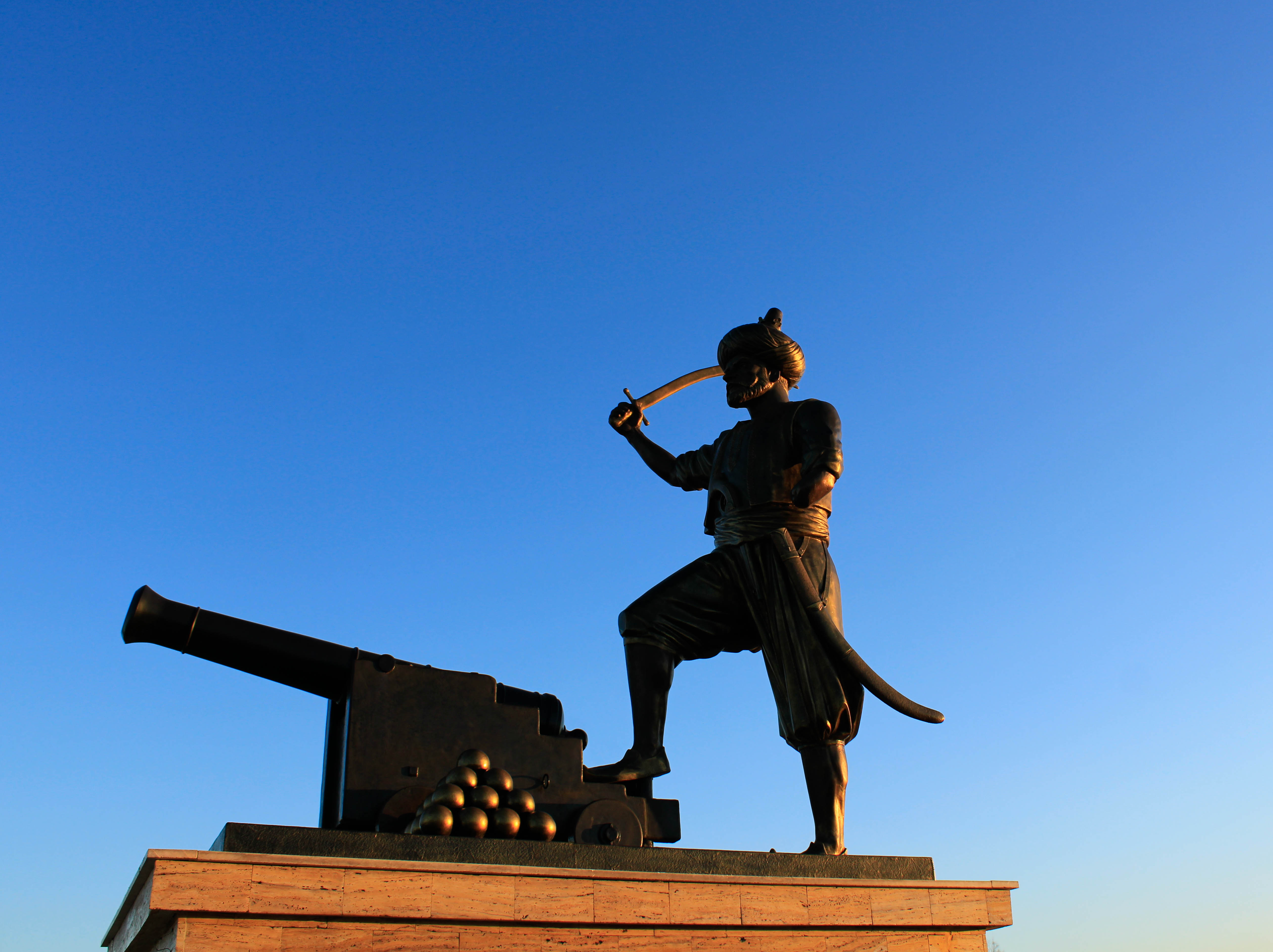
Aruj Barbarossa statue in Aïn Témouchent, Algeria

Aruj established the Ottoman presence in North Africa which lasted four centuries, de facto until the loss of Algeria to France in 1830, of Tunisia to France in 1881, of Libya to Italy in 1912.

Three submarines (TCG Oruç Reis, TCG Oruçreis (S-337) and TCG Oruçreis (RAD-14)) of the Turkish Navy have been named after Aruj.

In 2018, a statue of Aruj Barbarossa was inaugurated in Aïn Témouchent, Algeria.

== See also ==
- Ottoman Navy
- Oruç Reis-class submarine
- TCG Oruçreis (F-245)

== Sources ==
- Seyyid Muradi, Gazavat-ı Hayrettin Paşa, Turkey, 1973
- E. Hamilton Currey, Sea-Wolves of the Mediterranean, London, 1910
- Bono, Salvatore: Corsari nel Mediterraneo (Corsairs in the Mediterranean), Oscar Storia Mondadori. Perugia, 1993.
- Corsari nel Mediterraneo: Condottieri di ventura. Online database in Italian, based on Salvatore Bono's book.
- Bradford, Ernle, The Sultan's Admiral: The life of Barbarossa, London, 1968.
- Wolf, John B., The Barbary Coast: Algeria under the Turks, New York, 1979; ISBN 0-393-01205-0
- The Ottomans: Comprehensive and detailed online chronology of Ottoman history in English.
- Comprehensive and detailed online chronology of Ottoman history in Turkish.
- Turkish Navy official website: Historic heritage of the Turkish Navy (in Turkish)
