= Kingdom of Kuku =

c. 1515–1638 Algerian Berber state in North Africa

- c. 1510–c. 1730
- The kingdom at its biggest extant under Ahmed ou el Kadhi
- Status: Kingdom
- Capital: Kuku
- Common languages: Kabyle
- Religion: Islam
- King
  - 1515-1527: Ahmed ou el Kadhi
  - 1696-1730: Si Ali Boukhetouche
- History
  - Established: c. 1510
  - Disestablished: c. 1730
Preceded by	Succeeded by
Hafsids of Béjaïa	Regency of Algiers
- Today part of: Algeria

The Kingdom of Kuku was a kingdom in North Africa. It was established around 1515 CE and ruled by the Ath l-Qadi dynasty until 1632 or 1638 CE. Ahmed ou el Kadhi (Ou l-Qadi) is acknowledged as the founder. He was a descendant of a family of scholars and religious experts. At its height, the kingdom's authority extended from the Atlas Mountains to Algiers. From 1520 to 1527, the Kingdom of Koukou controlled Algiers and exerted influence over much of northern Algeria: it received allegiance from Cherchell and Annaba, maintained an alliance with the Zayyanids following its victory against Hayreddin Barbarossa at the Battle of Issers. This period influenced Algiers' toponymy, where a mountain is named Djebel Koukou. Hayreddin Barbarossa gradually regained lost ground, and the Kingdom of Koukou was then confined to a mountainous domain corresponding to present-day Greater Kabylie.

Its capital was Koukou, located on a promontory with about 15,000 inhabitants. Koukou was one of two major Kabyle kingdoms, the other being the rival Kingdom of Ait Abbas. At its peak, the Kingdom of Koukou maintained cordial relations with Spain and was involved in the failed expedition of Charles V against Algiers in 1541.

The Kingdom of Koukou, seat of the Zwawa tribal confederation, participated in expeditions of the Regency of Algiers—against the Kalaa (1559), at Oran (1562), Malta (1565), Tunis (1569), or Fez (1576)—and also provided mercenaries sought in Algiers, as well as abroad in Tunis or by the Saadians in Morocco, such as during the Battle of the Three Kings (1578).

The history of the Kingdom of Koukou fits into the political dissidence movement in certain regions of Algeria (Kingdom of Ait Abbas in Kabylie, Sultanate of Touggourt, and various confederations of the Sahara and High Plateaus) during the period of the Regency of Algiers, in relation to the latter.

The weakening of the Ait el Kadhi's control over local tribes, including the Zwawa confederation, contributed to its decline.

== Historiography ==
=== Designation as a "kingdom" ===
The term "kingdom" is not strictly accurate, as the administrative and regal entity was not structured around a king, but it appears in French texts on Kabylie. For example, Lucien Leclerc wrote:

At the time of the Barbarossas, we see the appearance in Kabylia of a small state known in history under the name of the Kingdom of Koukou.

Louis Rinn wrote in 1891 in a note in his work on the 1871 insurrection, known as the Mokrani Revolt:

The Kingdom of Koukou was founded in 1510 by Ahmed-ben-el-Qadi, who was a judge at the court of the last kings of Bougie. At the capture of this city on January 6, 1509, he had taken refuge among the Kabyles of the Ait-Ghoubri; he became the leader of a powerful confederation.

=== Longevity ===
Louis Rinn estimates that this state declined from the beginning of the 17th century:

From 1618, the family divided, its influence declined, the very name of Ouled-el-Qadi, borne by the chiefs of Koukou, ceased to be used and was replaced by that of Ouled-Boukhetouch. Today the family has been absorbed by the Berber element and has only insignificant influence in the upper Sebaou. Koukou is a taddert [village] of 600 inhabitants divided into six hamlets; it is part of the Imessouhal fraction of the Ait-Yahia, at the sources of the Sebaou.

Camille Lacoste-Dujardin estimates that the Kingdom of Koukou lasted for two centuries.

== Cultural and historical contexts ==
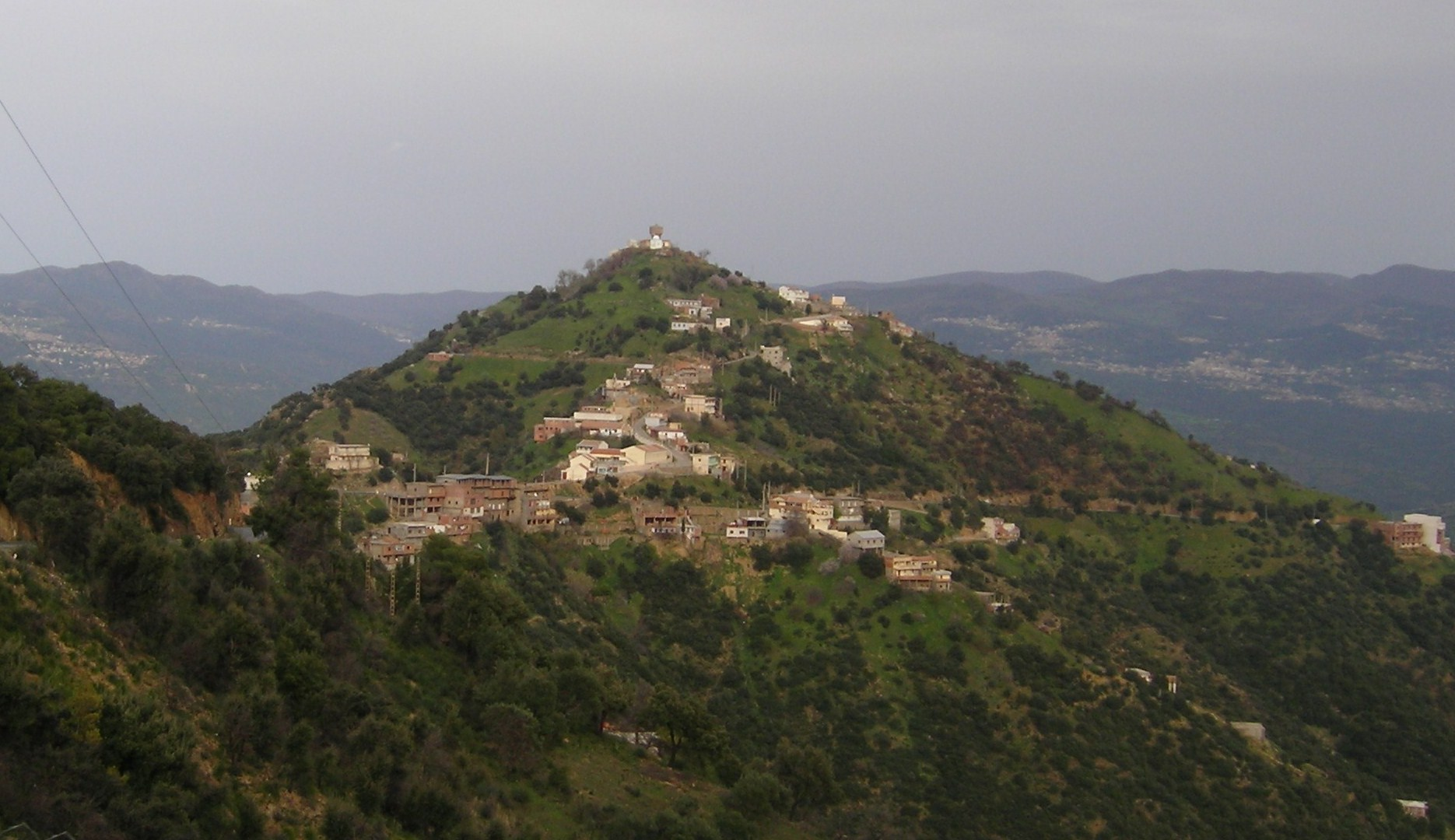
Koukou, capital of the kingdom of the same name.

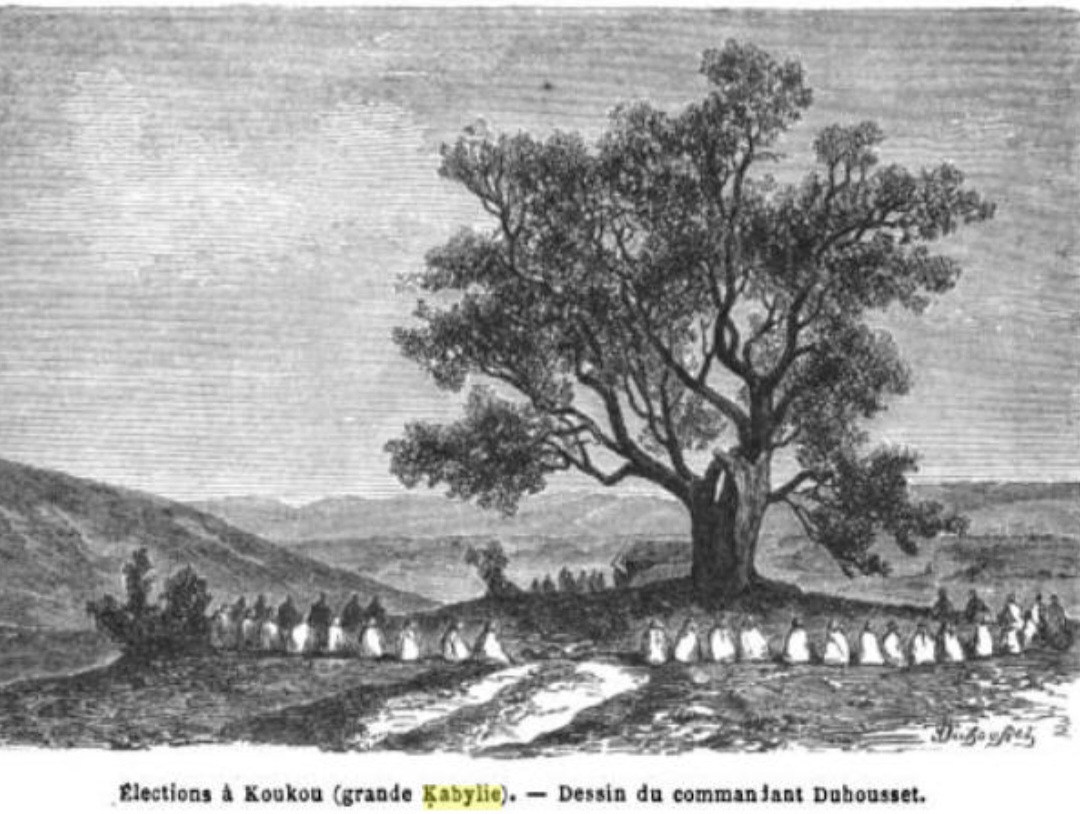
An election in Koukou

Since the subject concerns Kabylie, names sometimes have two versions, Berber and Arabic. Thus, "Ahmed ou el Kadhi" is a partly Berber form, the Arabic form being "Ahmed ibn el Qadi" or "Ahmed ben El Qadi", pronounced "Ahmed Belkadi". There is also the pair Ait Abbas/Beni Abbes, etc. (in addition to the issue of transcriptions from Arabic into French).

Historically, the Kingdom of Koukou is part of the history of the eastern part of the Maghreb (Tunisia, Constantinois, Algiers region) with, in the 16th century, the disappearance of the Hafsid dynasties and the establishment of the Regency of Algiers, then the Regency of Tunis, both under the tutelage of the Ottoman Empire; a secondary but significant phenomenon is the Spanish expansion on the Algerian coast (Oran, Béjaïa, etc.).

== History ==
=== End of the Hafsid era and foundation ===
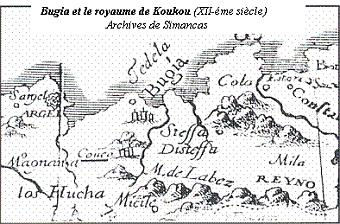
Map of the Kingdom of Koukou and the Kingdom of Ait Abbas according to a 16th-century Spanish map, preserved in the archives of Simancas.

Two hypotheses compete to explain the foundation of the Kingdom of Koukou.

One suggests it was founded before the capture of Béjaïa by the Spanish in 1510; in a context of weakening Hafsid power. This hypothesis has little support because it is unlikely that the Hafsids would tolerate the formation of this principality before the capture of Béjaïa.

The other attributes it to the Belkadi, a maraboutic lineage (a maraboutic family), a family of scholars in the service of the sultan of Béjaïa (dissident from the Hafsids of Tunis) and originating from the village of Achallam in the Ait Ghobri. They are said to be descendants of a prominent qadi of Béjaïa from the 13th century, Abu Abbas El Ghoubrini. In the service of the Hafsids, it is difficult to imagine they could have formed their principality before the fall of Béjaïa.

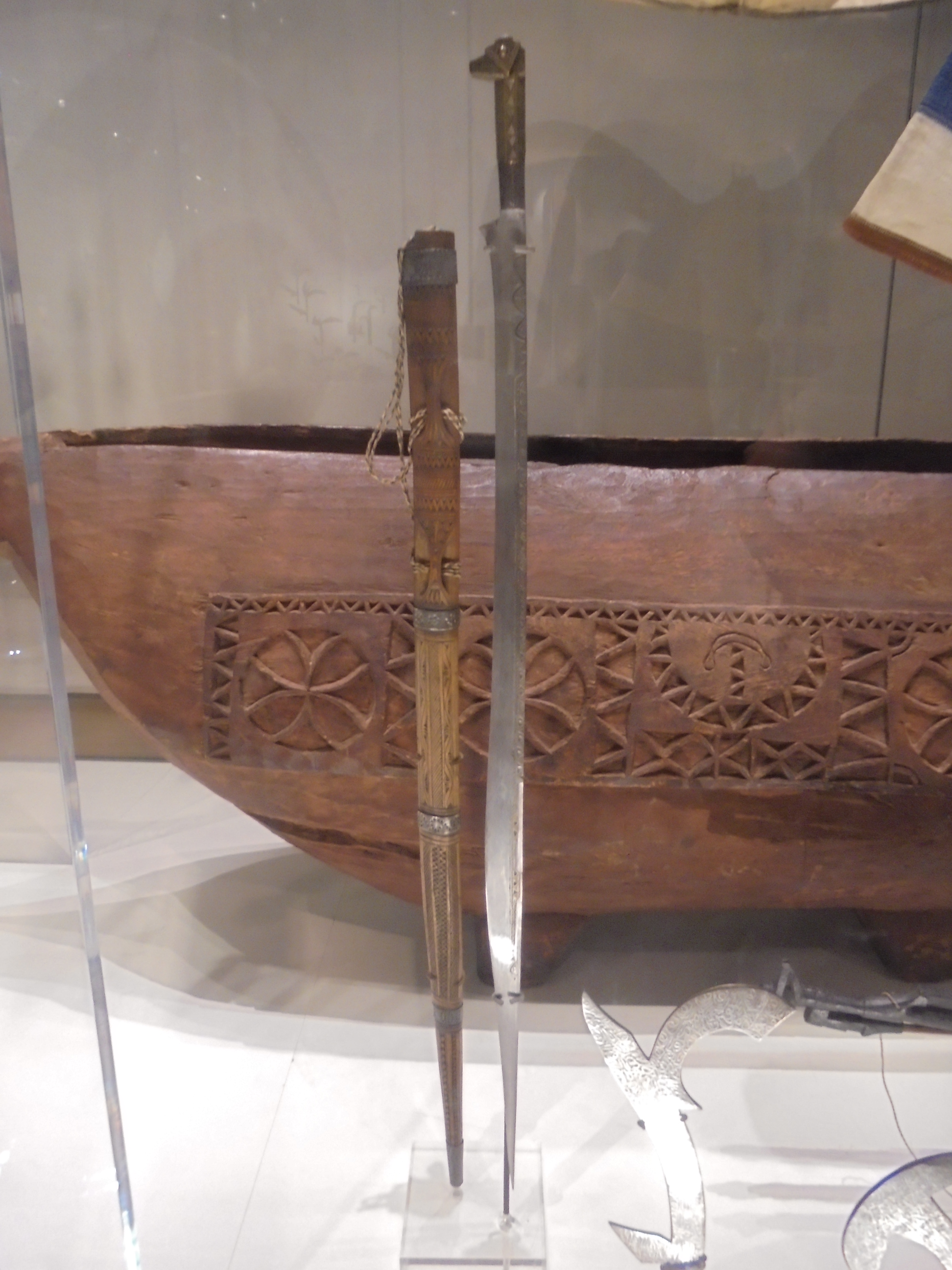
A Flissa is a traditional saber originating from the craftsmanship of the Kabyle tribe of the Iflissen Lebhar, at the British Museum.

During the fall of Béjaïa (1510) and the recapture of Jijel by the Barbarossas in 1514, the Hafsids (divided between a sultan in Tunis and another in Constantine) entrusted Ahmed Belkadi with defending the western part of their states with the title of khalifa rather than emir, as he was not a Hafsid. While this title of khalifa is uncertain (local tradition claims he held the position of governor of Annaba in the Hafsid era), these responsibilities in the western part of the Hafsid possessions after the capture of Béjaïa gave him a leading political role. In reality, Ahmed Belkadi was a leader who coalesced local forces in a "holy war" against the Spanish who had taken Béjaïa. The Barbarossas, who had become sovereigns in Algiers and possessed the city of Jijel, intended to establish themselves in central Maghreb. Aruj Barbarossa was bound by deep friendship to Ahmed Belkadi, with whom he conducted campaigns against places held by the Spanish: Belkadi and his Kabyle contingents attacked by land, and Aruj Barbarossa by sea. In 1512, the local emir of Bougie, in exile, appealed to the corsair to rid him of the Spanish, promising Aruj, in case of success, not only remuneration but to make him lord of Béjaïa, whose port would provide year-round security. However, the siege of Béjaïa was a failure, and Aruj lost his left arm.

Aruj reserved the environs of Algiers as his own territory and defined two territories, one to the east and one to the west. He left the eastern one as a hereditary fief to Belkadi and departed on a campaign to Tlemcen against the Zayyanid sultan allied with the Spanish. For the Barbarossas, this campaign was a disaster, resulting in Aruj's death. Belkadi broke his alliance with the Barbarossas and established his capital in the heart of Zwawa country (at Aourir then at Koukou) and drew the reprisals of Hayreddin, brother and successor of Aruj Barbarossa. The Belkadis' main support was the tribe of the Ait Ghobri, from which they originated; they were henceforth designated, particularly in Spanish historiography, as kings of Koukou (reyes de Couco) and of the Zwawas (los Azuagos).

According to Hugh Roberts, the Kingdom of Koukou should be seen as a remnant of the old Hafsid order that worked to defend its positions in the region. Faced with the collapse of the latter, then with a more aggressive policy from the Regency of Algiers, it later approached the Spanish to conclude an alliance.

=== Conflict with the Regency of Algiers ===
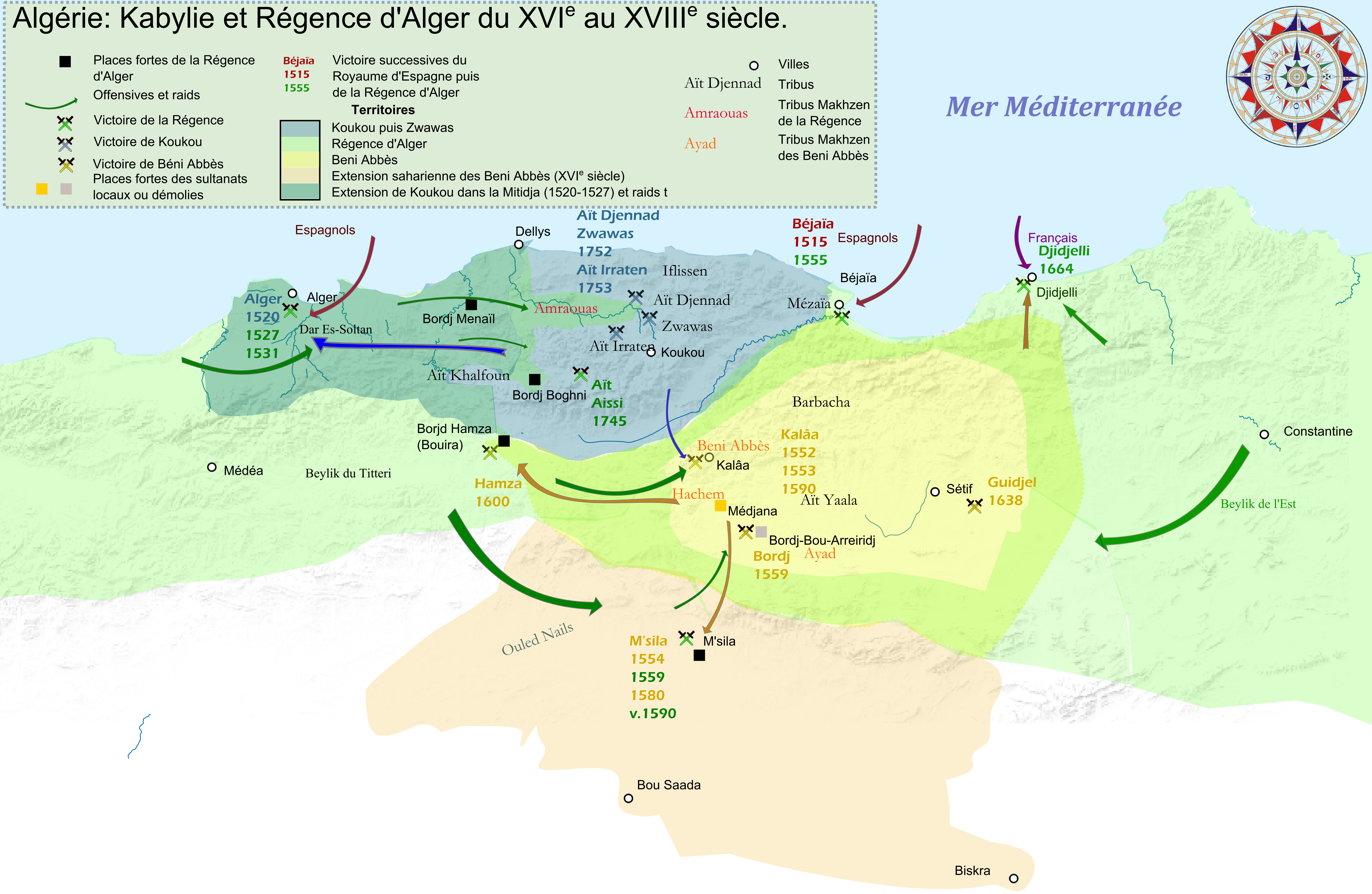
Conflicts between the kingdoms of Koukou, Beni Abbès, and the Regency of Algiers from the 16th to the 18th century.

In 1519, Hayreddin, at the head of the Regency of Algiers, campaigned against the Belkadis. The Hafsid sultan of Tunis sent reinforcements to the Belkadis and inflicted a heavy defeat on Hayreddin on the Oued Isser in the territory of the Aith Aïcha. Hayreddin, deprived of internal support (Kabyle tribes, reversal in 1518 at Tlemcen) and under Spanish pressure, decided to seek the support of Sultan Selim I. Thus, a rivalry played out between Hayreddin, his Regency of Algiers with Ottoman support, and Belkadi, backed by the Hafsids of Tunis. In the following years, Belkadi seized Algiers (1520) and was de facto king of Koukou and Algiers from 1520 to 1525/1527.

During their alliance with the Barbarossas (before 1518), the Belkadis ruled over lands from the Djurdjura to Sétif and Constantine. Since the break with the Barbarossas in 1518, the rise of a rival Berber kingdom on the eastern bank of the Soummam, that of the Beni Abbes, and the growing influence of the Turks of the Regency of Algiers in the east (capture of Jijel, Collo, Constantine...) reduced their domain to a territory roughly corresponding to Greater Kabylie, which it retained over the following centuries.

Throughout the 16th century, the Ait El Cadi played a significant regional political role by allying with the Spanish against the Turks or with the Turks against the Spanish, depending on political opportunities and stakes. In 1520, the sultan of Tunis, concerned about Barbarossa's rise after paying homage to Constantinople, marched on Algiers. Barbarossa was betrayed by the Kabyle troops of Koukou and forced to flee. The troops of Koukou occupying Algiers made themselves hated due to their tyranny, facilitating Hayreddin's task in recovering these territories.

Koukou was then considered one of the most formidable powers in the Mediterranean. Sidi Ahmed ou El Kadi was captured following a battle and killed by the troops of the Kingdom of Ait Abbas—his fraternal enemies—and his head was paraded in Algiers. Deprived of their leader, the Kabyle troops dispersed. The Turks, welcomed as liberators, became masters of Algiers again.

As an independent tribal chief, the most powerful was the king of Koukou, from the Ben-el-Kadi family, master of the Kabylie of Djurdjura, who has been successively a Barbarossa's ally and adversary, and who ended up accepting Turkish domination. He is an absolutely independent feudatory in his own home, with no other obligation than to pay a tribute, whose amount it is unknown, to the pashalik of Algiers, and to provide military assistance.

In 1546, Si Amar Oulkadhi succeeded his father. He reigned until 1618, the date of his assassination by his brother Mohamed, who seized power. His widow, Aïcha, pregnant, took refuge with her parents in the royal family of the Hafsids of Tunis around 1618. The same year, she gave birth to a boy. Nicknamed Boukhtouche (the man with the javelin), Si Ahmed Atounsi Boukhtouche, still an adolescent, returned to Kabylie at the head of a troop of soldiers provided by the Hafsid Sultan of Tunis, overthrew the usurper, reclaimed his father's throne, and settled in Aourir. During his reign, he repelled incursions by the janissaries and managed to preserve the kingdom's independence. Failing to subdue the Koukou, the Turks contented themselves with containing them.

Upon the death of Si Ahmed Atounsi in 1696, the family was torn by a bloody war of succession. Si Ahmed Atounsi's second son, named Si Ali, succeeded him in 1696; he was the chief of the Sod Tahtani. Weakened by divisions, Kabylie became accessible to Turkish ambitions, and at the beginning of the 18th century, the Turks founded a bordj at Tazarart on the right bank of Sebaou. Located in the plain, it was quickly destroyed by the Kabyles.

In 1720, Ali Khodja founded a bordj in the valley of the Sebaou, and in 1724, in that of the oued Boghni. The resistance leader was Si Ali Boukhtouche; he was defeated at Draâ Ben Khedda, then later at Boulzazen. In 1730, Ali Khodja organized the makhzen of the Amraouas (Kabyle tribe), then restored the bordj of Tazarart. The pashas of Algiers did not seek to establish their authority directly over Greater Kabylia but created a major command in the part of the country that no longer obeyed the central Kabyle power; the Turks placed at its head men from the great families of the country who already had personal influence over the populations.

The successor of Ali Khodja, the Bey of Titteri, Mohamed Ed-Debbah called the slayer, led numerous expeditions against the Kabyles without success. Ed-Debbah was killed in 1754 during a battle against the Ath Irathen near Tala n Semdha. His troops were driven beyond the banks of the Sebaou.

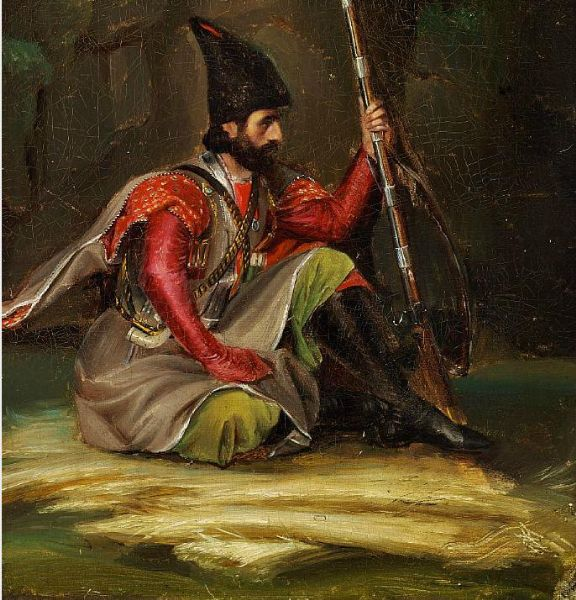
A Kabyle Warrior by Martinus Rørbye.

After Ed-Debbah's death in 1754, a violent revolt broke out in Kabylia against the Turkish regime. On the night of July 16, 1756, the Kabyles attacked the bordj Boghni, killed the caïd Ahmed, drove out the Turkish garrison, then completely destroyed the fortress. On August 25, 1756, encouraged by this success, the Kabyles attacked the bordj Bouira but were repulsed. It took three Turkish columns to defeat the insurrection. The bordj Boghni was rebuilt again, but Cherif Agha died in the fighting.

In 1818, the bordj was destroyed a second time during the uprising of the two Kabyle makhzen tribes, the Amraouas of Sebaou and the Guechtoula of Boghni: the Turkish garrison had to capitulate after 7 days of siege. The new agha of the Arabs, Yahia ben Moustapha, appointed on September 8, 1817, bolstered by the neutrality of the other confederations, overcame the revolt. He executed their leaders in an ambush. The bordjs of Boghni and Sebaou were rebuilt and provided with nouba.

A few years later, eastern Kabylie took the offensive in turn. The Mezzaïa blockaded Bougie, and the Beni Abbès interrupted communications between Algiers, Bougie, and Constantine. In 1824, Yahia Agha led several campaigns against them without much result. Then he had to turn against the Ait Ouaguenoun and the Ait Djennad who refused to provide wood needed for naval constructions. Lacking a decisive victory, the Turks eventually settled for a rather humiliating agreement that left them control of the plains.

Ibrahim Agha, who succeeded Yahia Agha in 1828, executed by order of the dey, was the last agha of the Arabs under the Turkish regime. He practically did not intervene in Kabylia.

== Foreign relations and diplomacy ==
In various negotiation letters between Spain and Koukou, several things are learned: a desire for alliance against the Turk, considered a common enemy: for this, the Kingdom of Koukou could mobilize up to 100,000 men, claiming superiority over the enemy. It nevertheless requested the sending of gunpowder and lead. The king of Koukou dangled various advantages to the Spanish king, including the possibility of building a stronghold at Oran. The king of Koukou wishing to see 50 galleys anchor in one of his ports, in 1604, a resupply attempt by frigates from Majorca failed nonetheless.

Two notables of the kingdom (named Amar the Elder and Abdelmalek) thus went to the court of Philip III. The mediation was through a Franciscan monk; the ambassadors of the Kingdom of Koukou were hosted for several months in Majorca in 1603, one of them converted to Catholicism.

The policy practiced by the Regency of Algiers under Hassan Pasha seems to have changed the Belkadis' attitude. Hassan Pasha married the daughter of the king of Koukou in exchange for his alliance. This probably explains the reversal of the alliance between Koukou and the Hafsids at the same time.

The Zwawas thus participated in Hassan Pasha's expeditions. In 1559, Zwawa troops participated in the siege of the Qalaa. In 1562, 12,000 Kabyles from Koukou and Beni Abbès participated in the great siege of Oran and Mers el Kébir. In 1565, among the 5,000 men led by Hassan Pasha during the Great Siege of Malta, 2,000 were Turkish janissaries and 3,000 "Moors and Kabyles". Under his successor Uluç Ali Pasha, the expedition against Tunis in 1569 was reinforced en route by a Moorish cavalry of 6,000 horsemen dependent on the sultans of Koukou and Beni Abbès and other chiefs. The Zwawas of Koukou also participated in the expedition against Fez in 1576 by sending 1,000 men alongside the 300 janissaries of Ramadan Pasha, and remained in garrison in the city. At the request of the Saadian sultan Abu Marwan Abd al-Malik who regained power thanks to this expedition, they formed his honor guard with the janissaries.

The Zwawas also participated in the garrisons of the cities of the Regency of Algiers. Hassan Pasha saw their recruitment as a way to counter the influence of the janissary odjak. However, he was deposed by the latter, who did not want to be marginalized from power in the long term.

== Power and society ==
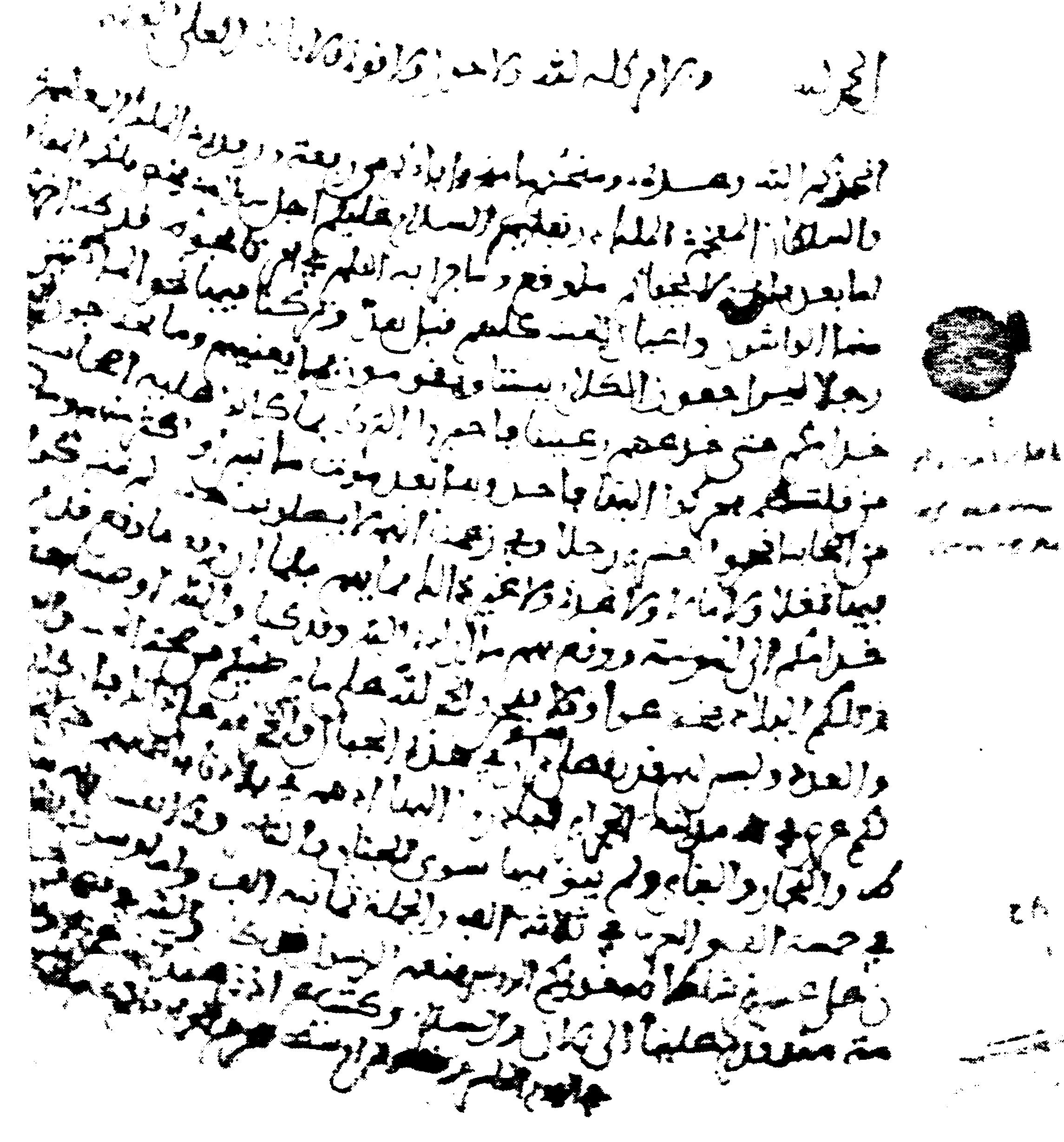
Letter from 'Amar Belkadi, sultan of Koukou, to Philip II of Spain (June 16, 1598).

The nature of the royal power exercised by the sultan over the tribes, particularly the Zwawa, could not take the form of a centralized administration. No tribe or village seems willing to abandon locally elected democratic jemaa, and the sultans of Koukou did not attempt to reform them. The sultan of Koukou appears, in fact, as a great lord with an army strong enough to restore order often troubled internally and to undertake external expeditions. According to Marmol and Carjaval, at the beginning of its history, the sultanate had a regular corps of 5,000 arquebusiers and 1,500 cavalry, and other troops from the country skilled in handling arms. Over its history, these troops seem reinforced: Amar Belkadi wrote to King Philip II of Spain that he could raise "100,000 men". This army was often employed, either against the Regency of Algiers, or conversely in alliances to aid it in western Algeria or against Christian powers, or (often) against the rival kingdom of the Ait Abbès.

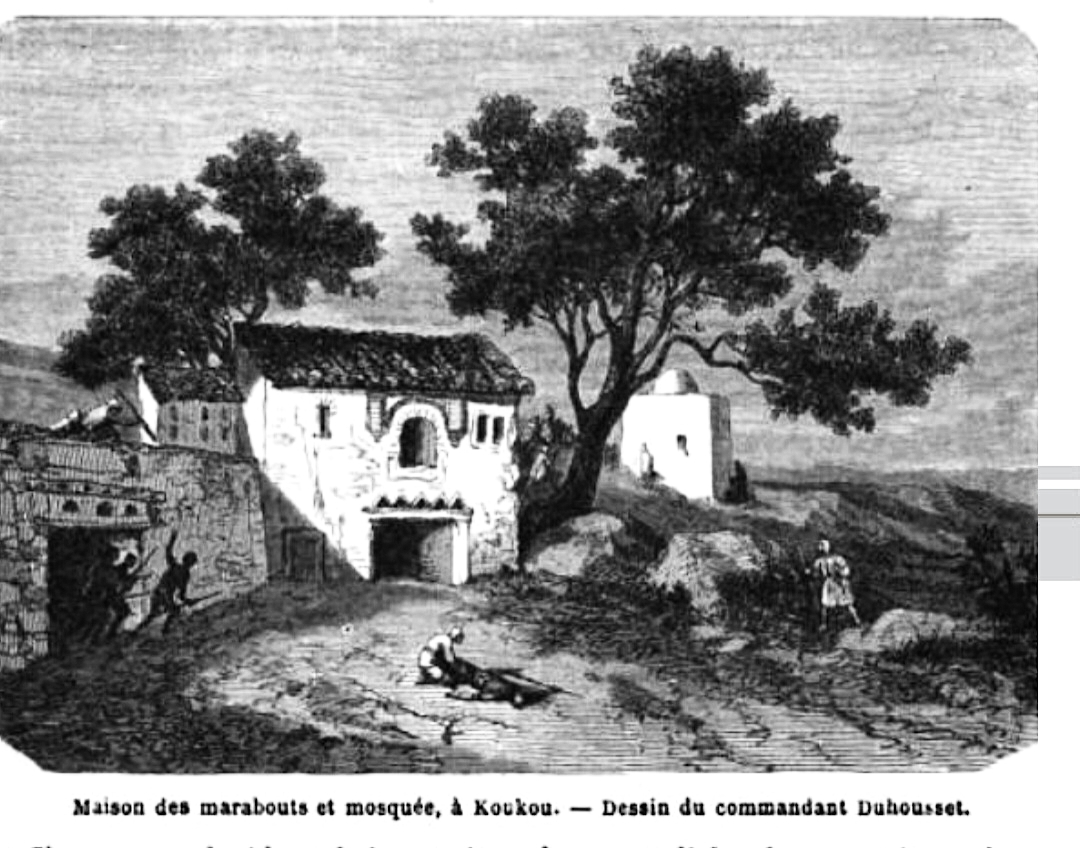
Marabout house and mosque in Koukou

All populations of the plains or high mountains participated in the war effort for the religious prestige inspired by the Belkadi dynasty, the play of village alliances, and much less for political reasons. To maintain their troops and vast domains in the plain, the Belkadis demanded taxes, dues, and corvées. However, these demands were made with great difficulty, particularly among high mountain tribes who felt safe from their authority. Local sovereigns thus had fairly limited power over their society and possessed modest seigneurial residences in Koukou or Achallam.

== Popular culture ==
In Algeria, official history reduces the kings of Koukou to a story of chiefdom. No establishment, no public building is dedicated to their history and resistance. A poem by the Australian Kenneth Slessor pays homage to the king of Koukou.

== Bibliography ==
- Hugh, Roberts (2014). Berber Government : The Kabyle Polity in Pre-colonial Algeria. I.B. Tauris.
