= Ahmed ou el Kadhi =

Ahmed Ou Lqadi
- Agellid
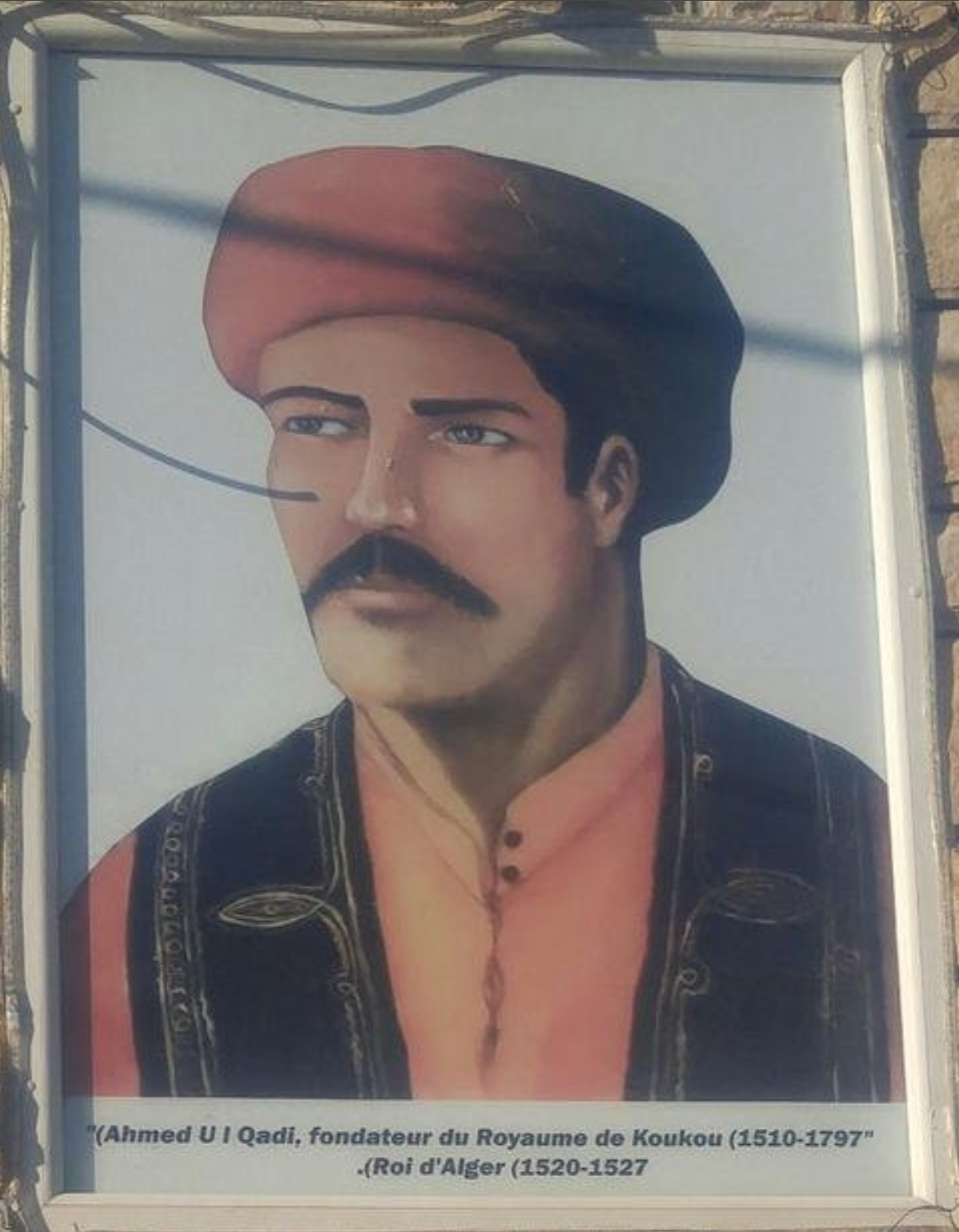
- Portrait of Ahmed Ou Lqadi.

Agellid of Kuku
- Reign: 1510 – 1527
- Predecessor: Office established
- Successor: Amar At Lqadi

Agellid of Algiers
- Reign: 1520 – 1527
- Predecessor: Hayreddin Barbarossa
- Successor: Hayreddin Barbarossa
- Born: c. 1480; Aourir, Kingdom of Kuku
- Died: 1527; Thenia, Kingdom of Kuku
- Issue: Ahmed
- Kabyle name: Ḥmed U Lqaḍi
- House: Ait Lqadi
- Father: Amar Ou Lqadi
- Religion: Sufism

Ahmed ou Lqadi (Kabyle: Ḥmed U Lqaḍi, c. 1480–1527) was the founder and first king of the Kingdom of Kuku in the Kabylie region of northern Algeria. He also briefly ruled Algiers between 1520 and 1527. Ahmed ou El Kadhi is remembered as a significant figure in Algerian history for establishing an autonomous polity in Kabylia.

== Early Life and Background ==
Ahmed ou El Kadhi, also known as Sidi Ahmed Belkadi, was born around 1480 in the village of Aourir, Kabylie. He belonged to the Ath Ghobri tribe and was a descendant of the 13th-century jurist Ahmed Abu El Abbès El Ghobrini. His lineage earned him the title "Belkadi," meaning "son of the judge."

== Political career ==
In the early 16th century, Ahmed served as governor of Annaba under the Hafsid dynasty. Following the Spanish capture of Bejaia in 1510, he acted as an intermediary in negotiations with the Spanish. In 1512, he allied with the Barbarossa brothers, Aruj and Hayreddin, in an attempt to recapture Bejaia, marking the beginning of his association with the Barbarossas.

== Founding of the Kingdom of Kuku ==
Around 1515, Ahmed ou El Kadhi established the Kingdom of Kuku with its capital at Kuku, a fortified city of approximately 15,000 inhabitants. Under his leadership, the kingdom extended its influence from the Atlas Mountains to Algiers, encompassing much of Western Kabylia.

== Rule over Algiers ==
In 1520, Ahmed led an expedition against the Regency of Algiers, then under Ottoman influence and controlled by Hayreddin Barbarossa. With support from the Hafsids of Tunis, he captured Algiers and ruled it until 1527, when Hayreddin reclaimed control.

== Death ==
Ahmed ou El Kadhi died in 1527 in Thénia, Kabylie, within the Kingdom of Kuku after a brutal battle against Hayreddin Barbarossa when Hayreddin was launching an expedition to reclaim Algiers His death marked the end of his direct influence over the region.

== Legacy ==
Ahmed ou El Kadhi is remembered as a pivotal figure in Kabyle and North African history.His brief control of Algiers illustrates his ambition and influence during a turbulent period in the Maghreb.
